= 1993–94 Wessex Football League =

Wessex Football League
- Season: 1993–94
- Champions: Wimborne Town
- Relegated: Whitchurch United

The 1993–94 Wessex Football League was the eighth season of the Wessex Football League. The league champions for the second time in their history were Wimborne Town. There was no promotion to the Southern League this season, but Whitchurch United were relegated.

For sponsorship reasons, the league was known as the Jewson Wessex League.

== League table ==
The league consisted of one division of 23 clubs, increased from 21 the previous season after Romsey Town were relegated and three new clubs joined:

- Andover, after taking voluntary demotion from the Southern League.
- Downton, joining from the Hampshire League.
- Petersfield Town, a new club formed after the dissolution of Petersfield United, who had been denied permission to switch from the Isthmian League to the Wessex League.

Pos	Team	Pld	W	D	L	GF	GA	GD	Pts	Relegation
1	Wimborne Town (C)	42	34	5	3	126	41	+85	107	
2	Andover	42	27	8	7	137	48	+89	89	
3	AFC Lymington	42	27	5	10	83	33	+50	86	
4	Thatcham Town	42	25	7	10	96	51	+45	82	
5	Gosport Borough	42	23	10	9	87	55	+32	79	
6	Fleet Town	42	21	9	12	82	48	+34	72	
7	Bemerton Heath Harlequins	42	19	11	12	72	56	+16	68	
8	Brockenhurst	42	17	12	13	70	64	+6	63	
9	B.A.T. Sports	42	17	10	15	66	66	0	61	
10	Christchurch	42	15	13	14	55	58	−3	58	
11	Bournemouth	42	16	6	20	67	78	−11	54	
12	Ryde Sports	42	14	10	18	61	77	−16	52	
13	Portsmouth Royal Navy	42	13	10	19	59	78	−19	49	
14	East Cowes Victoria Athletic	42	14	7	21	78	114	−36	49	
15	Eastleigh	42	12	12	18	47	54	−7	48	
16	Downton	42	12	10	20	59	82	−23	46	
17	Horndean	42	13	6	23	56	95	−39	45	
18	Petersfield Town	42	11	7	24	64	96	−32	40	
19	Aerostructures Sports & Social	42	11	6	25	41	84	−43	39	
20	Swanage Town & Herston	42	10	7	25	53	89	−36	37	
21	A.F.C. Totton	42	9	9	24	43	90	−47	36	
22	Whitchurch United (R)	42	11	2	29	51	96	−45	35	Relegated to the Hampshire League
23	Sholing Sports	0	0	0	0	0	0	0	0	Resigned after one match, record expunged (Note: Sholing Sports resigned from the league after playing only one match, when they lost their ground. The club folded some months later.)

(C) Champions; (R) Relegated
