= 1998–99 Wessex Football League =

Wessex Football League
- Season: 1998–99
- Champions: Lymington & New Milton

The 1998–99 Wessex Football League was the 13th season of the Wessex Football League. The league champions were Lymington & New Milton, in their first season as a merged club. There was no promotion to the Southern League, and neither was there any relegation this season.

For sponsorship reasons, the league was known as the Jewson Wessex League.

== League table ==
The league consisted of one division of 20 clubs, reduced from 21 the previous season, after Andover were promoted to the Southern League, Romsey Town were relegated, Ryde Sports resigned and AFC Lymington merged with New Milton Town of the Hampshire League. Three new clubs joined:

- Fareham Town, having taken voluntary demotion from the Southern League.
- Moneyfields, joining from the Hampshire League.
- Lymington & New Milton, the merged club.
- Aerostructures Sports & Social changed their name to Hamble A.S.S.C.

Pos	Team	Pld	W	D	L	GF	GA	GD	Pts
1	Lymington & New Milton (C)	38	27	6	5	92	31	+61	87
2	Thatcham Town	38	23	9	6	92	46	+46	78
3	A.F.C. Newbury	38	22	11	5	81	39	+42	77
4	Eastleigh	38	22	8	8	69	43	+26	74
5	Christchurch	38	22	7	9	72	53	+19	73
6	Wimborne Town	38	18	14	6	81	34	+47	68
7	Cowes Sports	38	19	8	11	77	54	+23	65
8	Moneyfields	38	17	8	13	69	62	+7	59
9	A.F.C. Totton	38	15	10	13	60	50	+10	55
10	Bemerton Heath Harlequins	38	17	4	17	59	54	+5	55
11	Brockenhurst	38	14	7	17	52	61	−9	49
12	Bournemouth	38	12	10	16	46	63	−17	46
13	Fareham Town	38	11	12	15	58	67	−9	45
14	Gosport Borough	38	11	11	16	66	71	−5	44
15	B.A.T. Sports	38	10	13	15	55	65	−10	43
16	East Cowes Victoria Athletic	38	10	4	24	48	103	−55	34
17	Hamble A.S.S.C.	38	6	9	23	37	68	−31	27
18	Portsmouth Royal Navy	38	6	9	23	42	81	−39	27
19	Whitchurch United	38	5	11	22	36	76	−40	26
20	Downton	38	4	7	27	40	111	−71	19

(C) Champions

== Wessex League Cup ==
The Jewson Wessex League Cup was won by Cowes Sports. They beat Lymington & New Milton on penalties after the match finished goalless.
