= 1990–91 Wessex Football League =

Wessex Football League
- Season: 1990–91
- Champions: Havant Town

The 1990–91 Wessex Football League was the fifth season of the Wessex Football League. The league champions for the first time were Havant Town, who were subsequently promoted to the Southern League.

For sponsorship reasons, the league was known as the Jewson Wessex League.

== League table ==
The league consisted of one division of 20 clubs, increased from 19 the previous season despite Newport (IOW) having joined the Southern League. Two new clubs joined:

- Ryde Sports, joining from the Hampshire League.
- Swanage Town & Herston, transferring from the Western League.
- Folland Sports F.C. changed their name to Aerostructures Sports & Social F.C.

Pos	Team	Pld	W	D	L	GF	GA	GD	Pts	Qualification
1	Havant Town (C, P)	38	24	8	6	76	30	+46	80	Joined the Southern League
2	Swanage Town & Herston	38	24	6	8	88	41	+47	78	
3	Bournemouth	38	24	4	10	69	33	+36	76	
4	Romsey Town	38	20	11	7	59	35	+24	71	
5	Wimborne Town	38	22	4	12	80	45	+35	70	
6	Thatcham Town	38	19	11	8	68	32	+36	68	
7	Brockenhurst	38	17	8	13	56	51	+5	59	
8	B.A.T. Sports	38	16	10	12	54	48	+6	58	
9	AFC Lymington	38	16	9	13	60	50	+10	57	
10	Fleet Town	38	17	6	15	64	57	+7	57	
11	Ryde Sports	38	17	6	15	62	55	+7	57	
12	Eastleigh	38	13	8	17	40	62	−22	47	
13	East Cowes Victoria Athletic	38	12	10	16	45	52	−7	46	
14	A.F.C. Totton	38	13	6	19	54	70	−16	45	
15	Christchurch	38	11	10	17	37	55	−18	43	
16	Aerostructures Sports & Social	38	11	6	21	32	62	−30	39	
17	Portsmouth Royal Navy	38	10	5	23	51	102	−51	35	
18	Bemerton Heath Harlequins	38	7	11	20	42	59	−17	32	
19	Sholing Sports	38	6	8	24	39	84	−45	26	
20	Horndean	38	5	5	28	39	92	−53	20	

(C) Champions; (P) Promoted
