= 1991–92 Wessex Football League =

Wessex Football League
- Season: 1991–92
- Champions: Wimborne Town

The 1991–92 Wessex Football League was the sixth season of the Wessex Football League. The league champions for the first time were Wimborne Town. There was no promotion or relegation this season.

For sponsorship reasons, the league was known as the Jewson Wessex League.

== League table ==
The league consisted of one division of 19 clubs, reduced from 20 the previous season after Havant Town joined the Southern League. No new clubs joined.

Pos	Team	Pld	W	D	L	GF	GA	GD	Pts
1	Wimborne Town (C)	36	25	5	6	82	37	+45	80
2	AFC Lymington	36	23	5	8	73	39	+34	74
3	Thatcham Town	36	22	4	10	85	45	+40	70
4	Romsey Town	36	21	6	9	72	42	+30	69
5	Swanage Town & Herston	36	20	7	9	78	38	+40	67
6	Bournemouth	36	20	6	10	73	48	+25	66
7	Ryde Sports	36	18	8	10	61	51	+10	62
8	Bemerton Heath Harlequins	36	17	10	9	51	38	+13	61
9	Aerostructures Sports & Social	36	18	5	13	59	40	+19	59
10	Eastleigh	36	18	4	14	61	53	+8	58
11	Fleet Town	36	13	10	13	59	55	+4	49
12	Brockenhurst	36	12	9	15	47	52	−5	45
13	Christchurch	36	9	11	16	39	54	−15	38
14	East Cowes Victoria Athletic	36	9	9	18	36	72	−36	36
15	Sholing Sports	36	9	7	20	43	81	−38	34
16	B.A.T. Sports	36	9	4	23	41	57	−16	31
17	A.F.C. Totton	36	7	8	21	43	71	−28	29
18	Horndean	36	5	3	28	33	109	−76	18
19	Portsmouth Royal Navy	36	4	5	27	30	84	−54	17

(C) Champions
