= 2009–10 FA Cup qualifying rounds =

Tournament details
- Country: England; Wales

The 2009–10 FA Cup qualifying rounds opened the 129th season of competition in England for 'The Football Association Challenge Cup' (FA Cup), the world's oldest association football single knockout competition. As in the previous year, 762 clubs were accepted for the competition.

The large number of clubs entering the tournament from lower down (Levels 5 through 10) in the English football pyramid meant that the competition started with six rounds of preliminary (2) and qualifying (4) knockouts for these non-League teams. The 32 winning teams from the fourth round qualifying progressed to the First round proper, where League teams tiered at Levels 3 and 4 entered the competition.

== Calendar and prizes ==
The calendar for the 2009–10 FA Cup qualifying rounds, as announced by The Football Association.

Round	Main date	Leagues entering at this round	New entries this round	Winners from previous round	Number of fixtures	Prize money
Extra preliminary round	15 August 2009	Levels 9–10	406	none	203	£750
Preliminary round	29 August 2009	Level 8	131	203	167	£1,500
First round qualifying	12 September 2009	Level 7	65	167	116	£3,000
Second round qualifying	26 September 2009	Conference North; Conference South	44	116	80	£4,500
Third round qualifying	10 October 2009	none	none	80	40	£7,500
Fourth round qualifying	24 October 2009	Conference Premier	24	40	32	£12,500
For the next rounds look 2009–10 FA Cup

== Extra preliminary round ==
The draw for the extra preliminary round was announced on The FA's website on 1 July. Matches in this round were played on the weekend of 15 August 2009, with replays played between 17 and 19 August 2009. 406 clubs from Level 9 and Level 10 of English football, entered at this stage of the competition.

Tie	Home team (tier)	Score	Away team (tier)	Att.
1	Bridlington Town (9)	0–0	Esh Winning (9)	170
replay	Esh Winning (9)	2–2 (2–4 p)	Bridlington Town (9)	80
2	Spennymoor Town (9)	5–1	Ashington (9)	171
3	Seaham Red Star (10)	1–4	Morpeth Town (9)	43
4	Sunderland RCA (10)	1–3	Ryton (9)	75
5	Bedlington Terriers (9)	2–0	Thackley (9)	102
6	Hebburn Town (10)	7–0	Eccleshill United (10)	44
7	Jarrow Roofing BCA (10)	2–1	Armthorpe Welfare (9)	26
8	Whickham (10)	2–0	Chester-le-Street Town (9)	98
Awarded to Chester-le-Street Town – Whickham removed for fielding an ineligible player
9	Scarborough Athletic (9)	1–2	Guisborough Town (10)	608
10	Selby Town (9)	0–0	Leeds Carnegie (10)	98
replay	Leeds Carnegie (10)	1–3	Selby Town (9)	70
11	Consett (9)	5–0	Billingham Town (9)	148
12	Team Northumbria (10)	4–0	Marske United (10)	32
13	Hall Road Rangers (9)	2–6	Bishop Auckland (9)	74
14	Norton & Stockton Ancients (9)	3–0	Pickering Town (9)	100
15	Shildon (9)	0–0	Northallerton Town (10)	91
replay	Northallerton Town (10)	1–2	Shildon (9)	164
16	South Shields (9)	1–4	Newcastle Benfield (9)	105
17	Pontefract Collieries (10)	1–4	Penrith (9)	70
18	Stokesley (10)	3–1	Crook Town (10)	78
19	West Auckland Town (9)	2–2	Brandon United (10)	30
replay	Brandon United (10)	2–1	West Auckland Town (9)	108
20	Whitley Bay (9)	2–2	Dunston UTS (9)	348
replay	Dunston UTS (9)	0–2	Whitley Bay (9)	251
21	Billingham Synthonia (9)	1–1	Birtley Town (10)	87
replay	Birtley Town (10)	1–3	Billingham Synthonia (9)	69
22	Horden Colliery Welfare (9)	0–0	Tow Law Town (9)	58
replay	Tow Law Town (9)	1–2	Horden Colliery Welfare (9)	94
23	West Allotment Celtic (9)	3–2	Liversedge (9)	79
24	Silsden (9)	3–1	Colne (9)	56
25	Congleton Town (9)	3–2	Dinnington Town (9)	142
26	Abbey Hey (9)	1–6	Hallam (9)	45
27	Chadderton (10)	2–2	Atherton Collieries (10)	35
replay	Atherton Collieries (10)	3–1	Chadderton (10)	72
28	Maltby Main (9)	1–3	Rossington Main (10)	42
29	Parkgate (9)	1–3	St. Helens Town (9)	66
30	Holker Old Boys (10)	0–2	Padiham (9)	40
31	Bacup Borough (9)	1–1	Atherton Laburnum Rovers (9)	100
replay	Atherton Laburnum Rovers (9)	1–0 (a.e.t.)	Bacup Borough (9)	53
32	Maine Road (9)	3–1	Alsager Town (9)	65
33	Squires Gate (9)	2–2	Staveley Miners Welfare (10)	55
replay	Staveley Miners Welfare (10)	2–2 (5–3 p)	Squires Gate (9)	70
34	Ashton Athletic (9)	1–2	Bootle (9)	48
35	Runcorn Linnets (9)	4–1	AFC Emley (10)	198
36	Nostell Miners Welfare (9)	2–1	Oldham Town (10)	72
37	Ramsbottom United (9)	5–1	Cheadle Town (10)	103
38	Flixton (9)	3–3	Winsford United (9)	50
replay	Winsford United (9)	4–6	Flixton (9)	60
39	Formby (9)	1–1	Glossop North End (9)	95
replay	Glossop North End (9)	3–1	Formby (9)	220
40	Meir KA (10)	0–4	Tipton Town (9)	46
41	Bewdley Town (10)	0–2	Alvechurch (9)	146
42	Cradley Town (9)	3–3	Biddulph Victoria (9)	36
replay	Biddulph Victoria (9)	0–1	Cradley Town (9)	37
43	Eccleshall (10)	1–3	Tividale (10)	57
44	Westfields (9)	5–0	Bolehall Swifts (10)	71
45	Stone Dominoes (10)	7–0	Cadbury Athletic (10)	35
46	Causeway United (9)	3–1	Wellington (Herefords) (10)	43
47	Studley (9)	1–0	Pershore Town (10)	87
48	Dudley Sports (10)	2–1	Southam United (10)	43
49	Coleshill Town (9)	2–0	Bridgnorth Town (9)	56
50	Pegasus Juniors (9)	5–1	Ellesmere Rangers (10)	40
51	Norton United (10)	2–5	Newcastle Town (9)	80
52	Dudley Town (10)	3–2	Walsall Wood (10)	48
53	Coventry Sphinx (9)	3–1	Bromyard Town (10)	116
54	Heath Hayes (10)	2–1	Lye Town (10)	46
55	Brocton (10)	5–1	Shifnal Town (9)	33
56	Castle Vale (10)	4–2	Goodrich (10)	79
57	Stratford Town (9)	5–0	Pilkington XXX (10)	174
58	AFC Wulfrunians (10)	2–1	Boldmere St. Michaels (9)	85
59	Rocester (9)	2–1	Wednesfield (10)	69
60	Nuneaton Griff (10)	3–1	Shawbury United (10)	60
61	Highgate United (9)	3–3	Malvern Town (9)	71
replay	Malvern Town (9)	2–1	Highgate United (9)	52
62	Holwell Sports (10)	2–2	Ellistown (10)	130
replay	Ellistown (10)	2–1	Holwell Sports (10)	132
63	Hinckley Downes (10)	1–4	Boston Town (9)	133
64	Borrowash Victoria (10)	3–0	Greenwood Meadows (10)	45
65	Barwell (9)	1–2	Long Eaton United (9)	101
66	Holbrook Miners Welfare (10)	5–0	Heanor Town (10)	118
67	Radford (10)	0–3	Rainworth Miners Welfare (9)	102
68	Oadby Town (9)	2–3	Kirby Muxloe (9)	136
69	Bardon Hill Sports (10)	3–2	Arnold Town (9)	117
70	Coalville Town (9)	3–2	Barrow Town (10)	155
71	Bottesford Town (10)	1–5	New Mills (9)	74
72	Dunkirk (10)	1–3	Winterton Rangers (9)	65
73	Lincoln Moorlands Railway (9)	2–3	St. Andrews (10)	72
74	Shirebrook Town (9)	2–2	Holbeach United (9)	95
replay	Holbeach United (9)	1–2	Shirebrook Town (9)	137
75	Sleaford Town (9)	2–0	Loughborough University (9)	126
76	Gresley (10)	2–2	Heather St. John's (10)	202
replay	Heather St. John's (10)	1–0	Gresley (10)	179
77	Teversal (10)	1–1	Bourne Town (9)	79
replay	Bourne Town (9)	3–0	Teversal (10)	81
78	Deeping Rangers (9)	1–1	Friar Lane & Epworth (9)	95
replay	Friar Lane & Epworth (9)	3–0	Deeping Rangers (9)	65
79	Gedling Miners Welfare (10)	1–1	Blackstones (9)	46
replay	Blackstones (9)	2–1	Gedling Miners Welfare (10)	79
80	Gedling Town (10)	2–2	Barton Town Old Boys (10)	37
replay	Barton Town Old Boys (10)	2–1	Gedling Town (10)	86
81	Long Buckby (9)	3–2	Hadleigh United (9)	83
82	Cornard United (10)	0–4	Gorleston (10)	22
83	Yaxley (9)	1–2	Rothwell Corinthians (9)	83
84	Great Yarmouth Town (10)	1–1	Raunds Town (9)	147
replay	Raunds Town (9)	1–3	Great Yarmouth Town (10)	104
85	Ely City (9)	0–1	Wisbech Town (9)	122
86	Whitton United (10)	0–5	Daventry Town (9)	62
87	Walsham-le-Willows (9)	1–1	Kirkley & Pakefield (9)	99
replay	Kirkley & Pakefield (9)	1–0	Walsham-le-Willows (9)	214
88	St. Ives Town (9)	6–1	Daventry United (9)	152
89	Needham Market (9)	1–0	Felixstowe & Walton United (9)	130
90	Wellingborough Town (9)	0–2	Wroxham (9)	129
91	Woodbridge Town (9)	1–4	St. Neots Town (9)	126
92	Desborough Town (9)	4–1	Newmarket Town (9)	77
93	Diss Town (10)	2–3	Cogenhoe United (9)	130
94	Dereham Town (9)	3–1	Leiston (9)	213
95	Godmanchester Rovers (10)	0–0	Haverhill Rovers (9)	45
replay	Haverhill Rovers (9)	0–1	Godmanchester Rovers (10)	67
96	Stewarts & Lloyds Corby (9)	1–2	Norwich United (9)	36
97	Northampton Spencer (9)	1–0	March Town United (10)	86
98	Stowmarket Town (10)	0–3	Mildenhall Town (9)	105
99	Clapton (9)	2–5	Kingsbury London Tigers (9)	48
100	St. Margaretsbury (9)	0–0	Hullbridge Sports (9)	65
replay	Hullbridge Sports (9)	0–1	St. Margaretsbury (9)	43

Tie	Home team (tier)	Score	Away team (tier)	Att.
101	Thame United (10)	1–0	Bedford (10)	84
102	Wembley (9)	2–3	Basildon United (9)	69
103	Erith Town (9)	2–0	Ampthill Town (10)	48
104	Leverstock Green (9)	2–1	Burnham Ramblers (9)	59
105	Oxhey Jets (9)	0–1	Brimsdown Rovers (9)	68
106	Eton Manor (9)	1–2	Stanway Rovers (9)	55
107	Wootton Blue Cross (10)	1–0	Sporting Bengal United (9)	40
108	Hertford Town (9)	1–2	Newport Pagnell Town (9)	211
109	Flackwell Heath (9)	4–0	Welwyn Garden City (9)	92
110	Bicester Town (9)	1–4	Dunstable Town (9)	54
111	FC Clacton (10)	2–1	London APSA (9)	99
112	Tiptree United (9)	3–2	Colney Heath (9)	72
113	Buckingham Town (10)	1–3	Hanwell Town (9)	71
114	Broxbourne Borough V&E (9)	1–4	Enfield 1893 (9)	184
115	Biggleswade United (9)	2–0	Stotfold (9)	76
116	Hillingdon Borough (9)	2–3	Kentish Town (9)	63
117	Hatfield Town (9)	2–2	Southend Manor (9)	84
replay	Southend Manor (9)	0–3	Hatfield Town (9)	46
118	London Colney (10)	4–1	Harwich & Parkeston (9)	59
119	Halstead Town (10)	1–1	Wivenhoe Town (9)	114
replay	Wivenhoe Town (9)	1–4	Halstead Town (10)	110
120	Potton United (10)	2–2	Hoddesdon Town (10)	142
replay	Hoddesdon Town (10)	2–0	Potton United (10)	71
121	North Greenford United (9)	0–2	Cockfosters (10)	48
122	Stansted (9)	2–5	Royston Town (9)	159
123	Chalfont St. Peter (9)	3–2	Tokyngton Manor (10)	28
124	Witham Town (9)	2–1	Saffron Walden Town (10)	117
125	Barkingside (9)	1–4	Bowers & Pitsea (9)	83
126	Crawley Green Sports (10)	3–1	Cranfield United (10)	102
127	Langford (9)	0–6	Aylesbury (9)	80
128	Barking (9)	2–3	Tring Athletic (9)	56
129	Harefield United (9)	1–1	Haringey Borough (9)	115
replay	Haringey Borough (9)	1–3	Harefield United (9)	78
130	Tunbridge Wells (9)	2–2	Sevenoaks Town (9)	117
replay	Sevenoaks Town (9)	2–1	Tunbridge Wells (9)	156
131	Raynes Park Vale (9)	2–2	Farnham Town (10)	42
replay	Farnham Town (10)	0–3	Raynes Park Vale (9)	37
132	Hailsham Town (9)	1–7	Lingfield (9)	62
133	Worthing United (10)	0–2	Badshot Lea (9)	73
134	Hartley Wintney (10)	1–2	Holmesdale (9)	98
135	Wick (9)	4–0	Frimley Green (10)	102
136	Deal Town (9)	3–2	Arundel (9)	130
137	Littlehampton Town (10)	1–1	Cobham (10)	153
replay	Cobham (10)	2–1	Littlehampton Town (10)	72
138	Southwick (10)	2–1	Herne Bay (9)	63
139	Chessington & Hook United (9)	0–2	Chertsey Town (9)	149
140	Egham Town (9)	2–2	Ringmer (9)	
replay	Ringmer (9)	2–0	Egham Town (9)	86
141	Whitehawk (9)	1–2	Hythe Town (9)	100
142	Banstead Athletic (9)	1–1	Pagham (9)	
replay	Pagham (9)	1–1 (3–2 p)	Banstead Athletic (9)	75
143	Camberley Town (9)	1–2	East Preston (10)	91
144	Oakwood (10)	2–4	Lordswood (9)	46
145	Croydon (9)	2–5	Shoreham (9)	68
146	East Grinstead Town (9)	4–1	Feltham (10)	56
147	Eastbourne United Association (9)	3–1	Redhill (9)	53
148	Erith & Belvedere (9)	1–1	Sandhurst Town (9)	78
replay	Sandhurst Town (9)	2–4	Erith & Belvedere (9)	63
149	Wealden (10)	1–3	Epsom & Ewell (9)	45
150	Cove (9)	4–0	Bookham (9)	40
151	Crowborough Athletic (9)	1–1	Bedfont (9)	84
replay	Bedfont (9)	3–2	Crowborough Athletic (9)	86
152	Slade Green (9)	w/o	Faversham Town (9)	N/A
Walkover for Faversham Town – Slade Green withdrew
153	Binfield (9)	3–5	Colliers Wood United (9)	142
154	Peacehaven & Telscombe (9)	1–3	Mile Oak (9)	107
155	Lancing (10)	0–2	Selsey (9)	93
156	Dorking (9)	0–0	Horley Town (9)	56
replay	Horley Town (9)	3–0	Dorking (9)	101
157	Crawley Down (9)	4–1	Westfield (Sussex) (10)	44
158	Molesey (9)	2–1	Sidley United (10)	56
159	Guildford City (9)	4–1	St. Francis Rangers (9)	65
160	Three Bridges (9)	1–3	Chichester City (9)	54
161	Hassocks (9)	1–4	Ash United (9)	74
162	Wootton Bassett Town (10)	2–2	Westbury United (10)	38
replay	Westbury United (10)	2–3	Wootton Bassett Town (10)	91
163	New Milton Town (9)	4–1	Cowes Sports (9)	48
164	Petersfield Town (10)	0–2	Brockenhurst (9)	149
165	Ringwood Town (10)	2–1	Christchurch (9)	99
166	Downton (10)	1–1	Calne Town (9)	51
replay	Calne Town (9)	1–0	Downton (10)	60
167	Milton United (10)	3–0	Corsham Town (9)	70
168	Bournemouth (9)	1–2	Highworth Town (9)	64
169	Fareham Town (9)	1–2	Moneyfields (9)	152
170	Hamble ASSC (10)	2–2	Wantage Town (9)	62
replay	Wantage Town (9)	4–1	Hamble ASSC (10)	52
171	Romsey Town (9)	3–0	Hayling United (9)	120
172	Lydney Town (10)	0–5	Totton & Eling (9)	220
173	Alresford Town (9)	8–0	Shaftesbury (10)	73
174	Warminster Town (10)	5–1	Amesbury Town (10)	116
175	Bitton (9)	1–1	Newport (Isle of Wight) (9)	93
replay	Newport (Isle of Wight) (9)	2–1	Bitton (9)	153
176	Laverstock & Ford (9)	1–3	Alton Town (9)	51
177	Devizes Town (10)	0–5	Shrivenham (9)	75
178	Almondsbury Town (9)	2–0	Longwell Green Sports (9)	115
179	Marlow United (9)	1–2	Hallen (9)	26
180	Ardley United (9)	2–2	Witney United (9)	96
replay	Witney United (9)	2–1	Ardley United (9)	113
181	Kidlington (9)	1–0	Abingdon Town (9)	154
182	Winchester City (9)	1–4	Bemerton Heath Harlequins (9)	107
183	Brading Town (9)	1–0	Fairford Town (9)	181
184	Carterton (9)	2–2	Bristol Manor Farm (9)	25
replay	Bristol Manor Farm (9)	1–1 (3–2 p)	Carterton (9)	48
185	Shortwood United (9)	1–0	Blackfield & Langley (9)	93
186	Reading Town (9)	2–0	Melksham Town (9)	52
187	Lymington Town (9)	6–0	Harrow Hill (10)	75
188	Wellington (Somerset) (9)	1–3	Bideford (9)	188
189	Launceston (10)	2–0	Clevedon United (10)	63
190	Bridport (10)	3–1	Keynsham Town (10)	111
191	Gillingham Town (10)	5–1	Cullompton Rangers (10)	209
192	Larkhall Athletic (9)	4–1	Shepton Mallet (10)	70
193	Radstock Town (9)	0–1	Wimborne Town (9)	85
194	Dawlish Town (9)	3–0	Elmore (10)	88
195	Barnstaple Town (9)	3–1	Tavistock (10)	124
196	Bishop Sutton (9)	1–2	Bodmin Town (10)	81
197	Willand Rovers (9)	2–2	Street (9)	80
replay	Street (9)	0–1	Willand Rovers (9)	97
198	Buckland Athletic (10)	1–1	Hamworthy United (9)	
replay	Hamworthy United (9)	3–2	Buckland Athletic (10)	129
199	Saltash United (10)	6–2	Chard Town (10)	118
200	Portishead Town (10)	1–1	Brislington (9)	115
replay	Brislington (9)	1–2	Portishead Town (10)	70
201	Ilfracombe Town (9)	0–1	Falmouth Town (10)	130
202	Sherborne Town (9)	4–1	St. Blazey (10)	138
203	Poole Town (9)	3–2	Welton Rovers (9)	212

== Preliminary round ==
Preliminary round fixtures were played on the weekend of 29 August 2009. A total of 334 clubs took part in this stage of the competition, including the 203 winners from the extra preliminary round and 131 entering at this stage from the six leagues at Level 8 of English football (all except Leyton from Isthmian League Division One North). The round featured 50 clubs from Level 10 still in the competition, being the lowest ranked teams in this round.

Tie	Home team (tier)	Score	Away team (tier)	Att.
1	Bedlington Terriers (9)	2–3	Garforth Town (8)	150
2	Chester-le-Street Town (9)	0–5	Norton & Stockton Ancients (9)	
3	Morpeth Town (9)	4–3	Billingham Synthonia (9)	
4	Selby Town (9)	1–2	Ryton (9)	101
5	Bridlington Town (9)	1–0	Shildon (9)	203
6	Wakefield (8)	0–0	Guisborough Town (10)	105
replay	Guisborough Town (10)	1–0	Wakefield (8)	149
7	Team Northumbria (10)	1–2	Ossett Albion (8)	20
8	Stokesley (10)	1–3	Spennymoor Town (9)	
9	Jarrow Roofing BCA (10)	2–0	Penrith (9)	
10	Hebburn Town (10)	3–4	Bishop Auckland (9)	90
11	Horden Colliery Welfare (9)	2–2	West Allotment Celtic (9)	
replay	West Allotment Celtic (9)	2–3	Horden Colliery Welfare (9)	
12	Newcastle Benfield (9)	1–2	Whitley Bay (9)	357
13	Brandon United (10)	0–6	FC Halifax Town (8)	217
14	Consett (9)	0–0	Harrogate Railway Athletic (8)	130
replay	Harrogate Railway Athletic (8)	1–1 (4–3 p)	Consett (9)	165
15	Warrington Town (8)	1–0	Leigh Genesis (8)	167
16	Clitheroe (8)	1–1	Staveley Miners Welfare (10)	157
replay	Staveley Miners Welfare (10)	1–3	Clitheroe (8)	97
17	Padiham (9)	2–4	AFC Fylde (8)	156
18	Bootle (9)	1–4	Woodley Sports (8)	100
19	Silsden (9)	1–4	Hallam (9)	67
20	Sheffield (8)	4–0	Flixton (9)	174
21	Trafford (8)	2–2	Rossendale United (8)	127
replay	Rossendale United (8)	3–1	Trafford (8)	137
22	Rossington Main (10)	1–2	Glossop North End (9)	110
23	Curzon Ashton (8)	2–2	Lancaster City (8)	164
replay	Lancaster City (8)	3–2	Curzon Ashton (8)	182
24	Chorley (8)	2–1	Nostell Miners Welfare (9)	191
25	Colwyn Bay (8)	2–4	St. Helens Town (9)	262
26	Cammell Laird (8)	2–1	Mossley (8)	71
27	Maine Road (9)	2–1	Ramsbottom United (9)	96
28	Atherton Laburnum Rovers (9)	1–0	Prescot Cables (8)	63
29	Atherton Collieries (10)	0–1	Radcliffe Borough (8)	96
30	Bamber Bridge (8)	6–0	Runcorn Linnets (9)	247
31	Witton Albion (8)	0–1	Congleton Town (9)	194
32	Salford City (8)	3–2	Skelmersdale United (8)	96
33	Castle Vale (10)	5–1	Studley (9)	50
34	Kidsgrove Athletic (8)	1–0	Alvechurch (9)	109
35	Dudley Town (10)	3–3	Bromsgrove Rovers (8)	159
replay	Bromsgrove Rovers (8)	3–0	Dudley Town (10)	148
36	Nuneaton Griff (10)	1–4	Stratford Town (9)	138
37	Coventry Sphinx (9)	4–4	Stourport Swifts (8)	108
replay	Stourport Swifts (8)	0–2	Coventry Sphinx (9)	110
38	Heath Hayes (10)	0–1	Tividale (10)	65
39	Pegasus Juniors (9)	2–2	Willenhall Town (8)	59
replay	Willenhall Town (8)	0–2	Pegasus Juniors (9)	95
40	Malvern Town (9)	1–1	Cradley Town (9)	36
replay	Cradley Town (9)	2–1	Malvern Town (9)	52
41	Atherstone Town (8)	1–2	Romulus (8)	147
42	Stone Dominoes (10)	0–1	Market Drayton Town (8)	75
43	Coleshill Town (9)	0–2	Causeway United (9)	65
44	Dudley Sports (10)	2–0	Rocester (9)	64
45	Chasetown (8)	1–1	AFC Wulfrunians (10)	307
replay	AFC Wulfrunians (10)	2–2 (5–4 p)	Chasetown (8)	427
46	Sutton Coldfield Town (8)	2–1	Tipton Town (9)	120
47	Leek Town (8)	2–3	Bedworth United (8)	214
48	Newcastle Town (9)	1–2	Westfields (9)	47
49	Brocton (10)	0–2	Rushall Olympic (8)	91
50	Carlton Town (8)	4–2	New Mills (9)	100
51	Borrowash Victoria (10)	0–0	Quorn (8)	58
replay	Quorn (8)	4–1	Borrowash Victoria (10)	165
52	Blackstones (9)	3–2	Shepshed Dynamo (8)	104
53	Barton Town Old Boys (10)	6–3	Kirby Muxloe (9)	86
54	Brigg Town (8)	4–0	Spalding United (8)	95
55	Lincoln United (8)	5–2	Friar Lane & Epworth (9)	75
56	Winterton Rangers (9)	6–1	St. Andrews (10)	58
57	Coalville Town (9)	0–1	Bardon Hill Sports (10)	245
58	Glapwell (8)	3–1	Ellistown (10)	83
59	Sleaford Town (9)	3–1	Stamford (8)	263
60	Rainworth Miners Welfare (9)	3–1	Heather St. John's (10)	84
61	Long Eaton United (9)	0–2	Loughborough Dynamo (8)	91
62	Grantham Town (8)	2–2	Mickleover Sports (8)	194
replay	Mickleover Sports (8)	3–1	Grantham Town (8)	160
63	Shirebrook Town (9)	0–2	Boston Town (9)	80
64	Belper Town (8)	1–1	Holbrook Miners Welfare (10)	228
replay	Holbrook Miners Welfare (10)	1–0	Belper Town (8)	251
65	Bourne Town (9)	3–1	Goole (8)	156
66	Desborough Town (9)	1–1	Daventry Town (9)	88
replay	Daventry Town (9)	2–1	Desborough Town (9)	123
67	Norwich United (9)	0–1	Long Buckby (9)	56
68	Woodford United (8)	1–2	AFC Sudbury (8)	76
69	Rothwell Town (8)	0–1	Bury Town (8)	108
70	Needham Market (9)	4–0	Wisbech Town (9)	147
71	Lowestoft Town (8)	3–0	Great Yarmouth Town (10)	639
72	Kirkley & Pakefield (9)	4–0	Cogenhoe United (9)	151
73	Gorleston (10)	1–1	Northampton Spencer (9)	134
replay	Northampton Spencer (9)	3–2	Gorleston (10)	79
74	Rothwell Corinthians (9)	0–0	Godmanchester Rovers (10)	82
replay	Godmanchester Rovers (10)	3–0	Rothwell Corinthians (9)	63
75	Dereham Town (9)	3–0	Wroxham (9)	259
76	Soham Town Rangers (8)	0–0	St. Ives Town (9)	156
replay	St. Ives Town (9)	2–1 (a.e.t.)	Soham Town Rangers (8)	202
77	Mildenhall Town (9)	3–0	St. Neots Town (9)	207
78	Great Wakering Rovers (8)	0–0	Waltham Forest (8)	80
replay	Waltham Forest (8)	1–0	Great Wakering Rovers (8)	67
79	Windsor & Eton (8)	3–1	Bowers & Pitsea (9)	105
80	Northwood (8)	3–1	St. Margaretsbury (9)	118

Tie	Home team (tier)	Score	Away team (tier)	Att.
81	Potters Bar Town (8)	1–1	Cockfosters (10)	83
replay	Cockfosters (10)	1–4	Potters Bar Town (8)	120
82	Harlow Town (8)	1–1	Kingsbury London Tigers (9)	142
replay	Kingsbury London Tigers (9)	2–1	Harlow Town (8)	70
83	Chesham United (8)	2–0	Chalfont St. Peter (9)	247
84	Marlow (8)	3–0	Ilford (8)	92
85	Witham Town (9)	3–6	London Colney (10)	107
86	Newport Pagnell Town (9)	0–2	Heybridge Swifts (8)	179
87	Aylesbury United (8)	2–1	Tiptree United (9)	164
88	Hanwell Town (9)	1–3	Concord Rangers (8)	46
89	Enfield Town (8)	2–0	Leverstock Green (9)	157
90	Enfield 1893 (9)	7–0	Crawley Green Sports (10)	76
91	Harefield United (9)	2–1	Biggleswade Town (8)	98
92	FC Clacton (10)	0–1	Hitchin Town (8)	159
93	Barton Rovers (8)	2–3	Ware (8)	100
94	Thame United (10)	2–0	Wootton Blue Cross (10)	74
95	Thamesmead Town (8)	4–2	Tilbury (8)	48
96	Leighton Town (8)	0–0	Aylesbury (9)	156
replay	Aylesbury (9)	1–0	Leighton Town (8)	121
97	Burnham (8)	2–1	Kentish Town (9)	77
98	Biggleswade United (9)	1–2	Halstead Town (10)	76
99	Stanway Rovers (9)	2–0	Beaconsfield SYCOB (8)	86
100	Cheshunt (8)	2–3	Maldon Town (8)	106
101	Tring Athletic (9)	0–4	Slough Town (8)	232
102	Dunstable Town (9)	0–2	Wingate & Finchley (8)	40
103	Arlesey Town (8)	2–0	Hatfield Town (9)	147
104	Hoddesdon Town (10)	0–1	Royston Town (9)	137
105	Erith Town (9)	3–0	Basildon United (9)	55
106	Brimsdown Rovers (9)	2–4	Flackwell Heath (9)	136
107	East Thurrock United (8)	2–0	Brentwood Town (8)	105
108	Redbridge (8)	0–1	Romford (8)	128
109	Croydon Athletic (8)	2–0	Godalming Town (8)	102
110	Sittingbourne (8)	0–0	Horley Town (9)	119
replay	Horley Town (9)	0–2	Sittingbourne (8)	123
111	Worthing (8)	4–0	Raynes Park Vale (9)	276
112	Merstham (8)	2–2	Faversham Town (9)	114
replay	Faversham Town (9)	4–4 (5–4 p)	Merstham (8)	150
113	Dulwich Hamlet (8)	1–1	Sevenoaks Town (9)	161
replay	Sevenoaks Town (9)	0–2	Dulwich Hamlet (8)	167
114	Ashford Town (Kent) (8)	6–1	Mile Oak (9)	147
115	Folkestone Invicta (8)	1–0	AFC Hayes (8)	218
116	Selsey (9)	1–0	Epsom & Ewell (9)	162
117	Chertsey Town (9)	0–1	Metropolitan Police (8)	71
118	Gosport Borough (8)	0–1	East Preston (10)	143
119	Lordswood (9)	1–1	Whitstable Town (8)	120
replay	Whitstable Town (8)	2–1 (a.e.t.)	Lordswood (9)	120
120	Horsham YMCA (8)	5–3	Wick (9)	134
121	Shoreham (9)	1–2	Crawley Down (9)	134
122	Chichester City (9)	1–3	AFC Totton (8)	100
123	Pagham (9)	1–2	Walton Casuals (8)	74
124	Fleet Town (8)	1–1	Walton & Hersham (8)	167
replay	Walton & Hersham (8)	2–2 (5–4 p)	Fleet Town (8)	140
125	Lingfield (9)	0–0	Southwick (10)	107
replay	Southwick (10)	0–3	Lingfield (9)	53
126	Burgess Hill Town (8)	2–3	Chipstead (8)	183
127	Andover (8)	2–3	Molesey (9)	111
128	Chatham Town (8)	1–1	Eastbourne United Association (9)	167
replay	Eastbourne United Association (9)	1–2	Chatham Town (8)	102
129	East Grinstead Town (9)	4–2	Cove (9)	72
130	Cobham (10)	0–6	VT (8)	58
131	Leatherhead (8)	3–0	Bedfont Green (8)	138
132	Guildford City (9)	3–1	Ramsgate (8)	110
133	Hythe Town (9)	4–0	Eastbourne Town (8)	152
134	Ash United (9)	4–0	Erith & Belvedere (9)	86
135	Bedfont (9)	4–2	Colliers Wood United (9)	65
136	Holmesdale (9)	1–3	Badshot Lea (9)	89
137	Deal Town (9)	4–1	Ringmer (9)	75
138	Corinthian Casuals (8)	1–3	VCD Athletic (8)	88
139	Whyteleafe (8)	0–1	Uxbridge (8)	95
140	Hallen (9)	0–0	Lymington Town (9)	74
replay	Lymington Town (9)	0–4	Hallen (9)	66
141	Shortwood United (9)	5–1	Romsey Town (9)	75
142	Highworth Town (9)	1–0	Bemerton Heath Harlequins (9)	175
143	Totton & Eling (9)	1–4	Kidlington (9)	118
144	Wootton Bassett Town (10)	0–1	Brockenhurst (9)	70
145	Yate Town (8)	3–1	Alton Town (9)	141
146	Mangotsfield United (8)	2–0	Bracknell Town (8)	134
147	Calne Town (9)	0–1	Shrivenham (9)	45
148	Bishop's Cleeve (8)	3–1	Reading Town (9)	95
149	Bristol Manor Farm (9)	4–4	Warminster Town (10)	62
replay	Warminster Town (10)	2–4	Bristol Manor Farm (9)	230
150	North Leigh (8)	2–1	Milton United (10)	89
151	Almondsbury Town (9)	2–1	Cinderford Town (8)	71
152	Wantage Town (9)	5–0	Newport (Isle of Wight) (9)	102
153	Moneyfields (9)	3–4	Hungerford Town (8)	100
154	Ringwood Town (10)	1–3	Abingdon United (8)	59
155	Brading Town (9)	3–2	Alresford Town (9)	130
156	Witney United (9)	3–1	New Milton Town (9)	124
157	Cirencester Town (8)	2–1	Thatcham Town (8)	106
158	Wimborne Town (9)	2–1	Sherborne Town (9)	
159	Paulton Rovers (8)	3–1	Bideford (9)	123
160	Falmouth Town (10)	1–1	Willand Rovers (9)	130
replay	Willand Rovers (9)	2–1	Falmouth Town (10)	86
161	Taunton Town (8)	2–1	Bodmin Town (10)	210
162	Poole Town (9)	7–2	Barnstaple Town (9)	232
163	Launceston (10)	2–3	Bridgwater Town (8)	140
164	Bridport (10)	3–3	Dawlish Town (9)	137
replay	Dawlish Town (9)	1–2	Bridport (10)	92
165	Gillingham Town (10)	6–0	Portishead Town (10)	209
166	Larkhall Athletic (9)	0–2	Saltash United (10)	94
167	Hamworthy United (9)	3–2	Frome Town (8)	117

== First round qualifying ==
The first round qualifying fixtures were played on the weekend of 12 September 2009, with replays being played the following mid-week. A total of 232 clubs took part in this stage of the competition, including the 167 winners from the preliminary round and 65 entering at this stage from the top division of the three leagues at Level 7 of English football, while Halesowen Town from Southern League Premier Division was barred from FA Cup because of financial difficulties. The round featured 17 clubs from Level 10 still in the competition, being the lowest-ranked clubs in this round.

As Newcastle Blue Star folded after the draw took place, Ossett Albion were given a walkover to the second round qualifying.

Bobby Traynor was voted Player of the Round for his hat-trick in Kingstonian's 4–1 win against Bognor Regis Town.

Tie	Home team (tier)	Score	Away team (tier)	Att.
1	Horden Colliery Welfare (9)	2–2	Durham City (7)	153
replay	Durham City (7)	1–3	Horden Colliery Welfare (9)	115
2	North Ferriby United (7)	2–0	Harrogate Railway Athletic (8)	121
3	Newcastle Blue Star (7)	w/o	Ossett Albion (8)	N/A
Walkover for Ossett Albion – Newcastle Blue Star folded
4	Kendal Town (7)	9–1	Guisborough Town (10)	161
5	Ryton (9)	0–6	Spennymoor Town (9)	
6	Morpeth Town (9)	0–1	Ossett Town (7)	38
7	Norton & Stockton Ancients (9)	0–4	FC Halifax Town (8)	290
8	Bridlington Town (9)	0–1	Whitby Town (7)	370
9	Bradford Park Avenue (7)	4–1	Bishop Auckland (9)	246
10	Jarrow Roofing BCA (10)	1–0	Garforth Town (8)	50
11	Guiseley (7)	2–0	Whitley Bay (9)	301
12	Hallam (9)	0–4	Burscough (7)	135
13	Cammell Laird (8)	3–1	St Helens Town (9)	95
14	Maine Road (9)	1–4	Bamber Bridge (8)	86
15	Clitheroe (8)	0–2	Stocksbridge Park Steels (7)	201
16	Congleton Town (9)	1–1	Atherton Laburnum Rovers (9)	89
replay	Atherton Laburnum Rovers (9)	0–5	Congleton Town (9)	197
17	Warrington Town (8)	1–0	Nantwich Town (7)	204
18	Worksop Town (7)	1–1	Frickley Athletic (7)	178
replay	Frickley Athletic (7)	2–1	Worksop Town (7)	228
19	Lancaster City (8)	0–3	Ashton United (7)	191
20	Glossop North End (9)	2–3	Chorley (8)	295
21	AFC Fylde (8)	4–1	Rossendale United (8)	253
22	Salford City (8)	2–1	Marine (7)	159
23	Woodley Sports (8)	0–1	Radcliffe Borough (8)	141
24	Sheffield (8)	1–3	FC United of Manchester (7)	1,208
25	Causeway United (9)	0–0	Bedworth United (8)	138
replay	Bedworth United (8)	3–0	Causeway United (9)	163
26	Westfields (9)	0–6	Sutton Coldfield Town (8)	102
27	Hednesford Town (7)	1–4	Pegasus Juniors (9)	244
28	Evesham United (7)	0–0	Tividale (10)	131
replay	Tividale (10)	1–2	Evesham United (7)	140
29	Cradley Town (9)	0–1	Stratford Town (9)	76
30	Bromsgrove Rovers (8)	1–1	Stourbridge (7)	465
replay	Stourbridge (7)	3–1	Bromsgrove Rovers (8)	255
31	Kidsgrove Athletic (8)	2–3	AFC Wulfrunians (10)	212
32	Coventry Sphinx (9)	1–0	Rushall Olympic (8)	196
33	Leamington (7)	0–2	Market Drayton Town (8)	530
34	Romulus (8)	2–1	Castle Vale (10)	95
35	Rugby Town (7)	6–0	Dudley Sports (10)	212
36	Rainworth Miners Welfare (9)	2–1	Holbrook Miners Welfare (10)	155
37	Bourne Town (9)	3–1	Boston Town (9)	125
38	Buxton (7)	2–1	Winterton Rangers (9)	256
39	Retford United (7)	1–1	Lincoln United (8)	258
replay	Lincoln United (8)	2–1	Retford United (7)	182
40	Bardon Hill Sports (10)	5–0	Barton Town Old Boys (10)	126
41	Blackstones (9)	2–4	Hucknall Town (7)	105
42	Quorn (8)	0–2	Mickleover Sports (8)	150
43	Brigg Town (8)	0–5	Nuneaton Town (7)	221
44	Matlock Town (7)	1–1	Sleaford Town (9)	155
replay	Sleaford Town (9)	1–2	Matlock Town (7)	421
45	Glapwell (8)	0–1	Carlton Town (8)	63
46	Boston United (7)	4–2	Loughborough Dynamo (8)	941
47	Lowestoft Town (8)	3–1	Dereham Town (9)	779
48	Godmanchester Rovers (10)	1–2	Northampton Spencer (9)	120
49	St. Ives Town (9)	1–2	Kirkley & Pakefield (9)	274
50	Bury Town (8)	2–0	King's Lynn (7)	604
51	AFC Sudbury (8)	0–2	Needham Market (9)	362
52	Long Buckby (9)	1–1	Mildenhall Town (9)	89
replay	Mildenhall Town (9)	4–3	Long Buckby (9)	178
53	Cambridge City (7)	2–0	Daventry Town (9)	264
54	Harefield United (9)	3–1	Maldon Town (8)	112
55	Canvey Island (7)	3–3	Hitchin Town (8)	323
replay	Hitchin Town (8)	0–1	Canvey Island (7)	251
56	Enfield 1893 (9)	3–3	Halstead Town (10)	98
replay	Halstead Town (10)	1–1 (0–2 p)	Enfield 1893 (9)	171
57	Flackwell Heath (9)	2–1	Royston Town (9)	85
58	Chesham United (8)	1–1	Harrow Borough (7)	286
replay	Harrow Borough (7)	0–2	Chesham United (8)	158
59	Erith Town (9)	3–3	Aylesbury (9)	72
replay	Aylesbury (9)	2–1	Erith Town (9)	84

Tie	Home team (tier)	Score	Away team (tier)	Att.
60	Heybridge Swifts (8)	1–1	Stanway Rovers (9)	168
replay	Stanway Rovers (9)	0–0 (3–4 p)	Heybridge Swifts (8)	186
61	Waltham Abbey (7)	0–1	Enfield Town (8)	260
62	Thamesmead Town (8)	1–2	Windsor & Eton (8)	59
63	Arlesey Town (8)	1–2	Wealdstone (7)	236
64	Thame United (10)	0–2	Burnham (8)	113
65	East Thurrock United (8)	4–1	Ware (8)	115
66	Northwood (8)	2–2	Wingate & Finchley (8)	
replay	Wingate & Finchley (8)	3–1	Northwood (8)	85
67	Hemel Hempstead Town (7)	1–1	Slough Town (8)	395
replay	Slough Town (8)	2–1	Hemel Hempstead Town (7)	249
68	Marlow (8)	0–2	Hendon (7)	150
69	AFC Hornchurch (7)	0–3	Billericay Town (7)	453
70	Aylesbury United (8)	0–0	Potters Bar Town (8)	133
replay	Potters Bar Town (8)	2–0	Aylesbury United (8)	82
71	London Colney (10)	1–1	Aveley (7)	
replay	Aveley (7)	4–2	London Colney (10)	146
72	Boreham Wood (7)	1–0	Waltham Forest (8)	81
73	Bedford Town (7)	5–1	Kingsbury London Tigers (9)	215
74	Romford (8)	1–1	Concord Rangers (8)	
replay	Concord Rangers (8)	6–0	Romford (8)	125
75	Guildford City (9)	4–4	East Preston (10)	73
replay	East Preston (10)	2–2 (4–3 p)	Guildford City (9)	104
76	Molesey (9)	2–3	Bashley (7)	92
77	Walton & Hersham (8)	2–1	Cray Wanderers (7)	108
78	Chatham Town (8)	0–0	Walton Casuals (8)	
replay	Walton Casuals (8)	2–1	Chatham Town (8)	108
79	Farnborough (7)	2–1	Hastings United (7)	716
80	Whitstable Town (8)	2–1	Carshalton Athletic (7)	176
81	Crawley Down (9)	2–3	Ashford Town (Middlesex) (7)	101
82	Leatherhead (8)	2–0	Ashford Town (Kent) (8)	163
83	Uxbridge (8)	4–3	Ash United (9)	116
84	Bognor Regis Town (7)	1–4	Kingstonian (7)	402
85	Folkestone Invicta (8)	0–1	Sittingbourne (8)	360
86	Maidstone United (7)	2–1	Bedfont (9)	294
87	Hythe Town (9)	2–1	Faversham Town (9)	215
88	AFC Totton (8)	5–0	VCD Athletic (8)	185
89	Lingfield (9)	4–4	Badshot Lea (9)	144
replay	Badshot Lea (9)	2–1	Lingfield (9)	
90	Chipstead (8)	1–6	Dartford (7)	321
91	Tooting & Mitcham United (7)	4–2	Horsham (7)	346
92	Deal Town (9)	1–1	Selsey (9)	120
replay	Selsey (9)	3–0	Deal Town (9)	145
93	VT (8)	1–0	Dulwich Hamlet (8)	173
94	Tonbridge Angels (7)	1–0	Metropolitan Police (8)	352
95	Croydon Athletic (8)	0–1	Worthing (8)	161
96	Horsham YMCA (8)	1–0	East Grinstead Town (9)	196
97	Margate (7)	2–2	Sutton United (7)	402
replay	Sutton United (7)	3–2	Margate (7)	301
98	Almondsbury Town (9)	1–1	Yate Town (8)	
replay	Yate Town (8)	1–2	Almondsbury Town (9)	205
99	Brading Town (9)	1–1	Hallen (9)	123
replay	Hallen (9)	3–0	Brading Town (9)	89
100	Banbury United (7)	0–0	Chippenham Town (7)	361
replay	Chippenham Town (7)	3–2	Banbury United (7)	306
101	Brackley Town (7)	1–0	Swindon Supermarine (7)	180
102	Bishop's Cleeve (8)	5–2	Brockenhurst (9)	67
103	Oxford City (7)	4–2	Kidlington (9)	320
104	Mangotsfield United (8)	3–0	Wantage Town (9)	146
105	Shortwood United (9)	3–3	Witney United (9)	108
replay	Witney United (9)	2–1	Shortwood United (9)	151
106	Highworth Town (9)	0–3	Abingdon United (8)	134
107	Hungerford Town (8)	4–0	Bristol Manor Farm (9)	137
108	Didcot Town (7)	5–0	Shrivenham (9)	226
109	Cirencester Town (8)	2–1	North Leigh (8)	144
110	Bridgwater Town (8)	3–1	Hamworthy United (9)	249
111	Saltash United (10)	1–1	Gillingham Town (10)	
replay	Gillingham Town (10)	6–5	Saltash United (10)	381
112	Truro City (7)	1–1	Bridport (10)	
replay	Bridport (10)	0–7	Truro City (7)	335
113	Taunton Town (8)	0–3	Merthyr Tydfil (7)	340
114	Willand Rovers (9)	1–0	Poole Town (9)	163
115	Paulton Rovers (8)	1–0	Tiverton Town (7)	243
116	Clevedon Town (7)	4–2	Wimborne Town (9)	132

== Second round qualifying ==
The second round qualifying fixtures were played on the weekend of 26 September 2009. A total of 160 clubs took part in this stage of the competition, including the 116 winners from the first round qualifying and 44 Level 6 clubs, from Conference North and Conference South, entering at this stage. AFC Wulfrunians, Bardon Hill Sports, East Preston, Gillingham Town and Jarrow Roofing BCA from Level 10 of English football, were the lowest-ranked clubs to qualify for this round of the competition.

Tie	Home team (tier)	Score	Away team (tier)	Att.
1	Whitby Town (7)	0–5	Vauxhall Motors (6)	286
2	Warrington Town (8)	1–1	Radcliffe Borough (8)	234
replay	Radcliffe Borough (8)	3–1	Warrington Town (8)	169
3	Congleton Town (9)	0–1	Frickley Athletic (7)	294
4	Lincoln United (8)	2–1	Jarrow Roofing BCA (10)	151
5	Kendal Town (7)	2–0	Ossett Town (7)	183
6	Droylsden (6)	0–2	FC Halifax Town (8)	902
7	Horden Colliery Welfare (9)	1–4	Burscough (7)	86
8	Blyth Spartans (6)	7–1	Ossett Albion (8)	507
9	North Ferriby United (7)	0–1	FC United of Manchester (7)	838
10	Hyde United (6)	2–2	Salford City (8)	276
replay	Salford City (8)	1–0	Hyde United (6)	391
11	Chorley (8)	2–1	Ashton United (7)	294
12	Southport (6)	3–1	Spennymoor Town (9)	554
13	Bradford Park Avenue (7)	4–0	Harrogate Town (6)	375
14	Northwich Victoria (6)	8–0	Bardon Hill Sports (10)	502
15	Fleetwood Town (6)	3–1	Farsley Celtic (6)	730
16	Workington (6)	4–1	Cammell Laird (8)	302
17	Stocksbridge Park Steels (7)	2–7	Stalybridge Celtic (6)	352
18	Guiseley (7)	2–0	Bamber Bridge (8)	298
19	Buxton (7)	5–0	AFC Fylde (8)	292
20	Coventry Sphinx (9)	2–2	Stafford Rangers (6)	312
replay	Stafford Rangers (6)	2–3	Coventry Sphinx (9)	465
21	Matlock Town (7)	2–2	Bury Town (8)	341
replay	Bury Town (8)	2–0	Matlock Town (7)	518
22	Nuneaton Town (7)	1–1	Carlton Town (8)	905
replay	Carlton Town (8)	0–3	Nuneaton Town (7)	254
23	Bedford Town (7)	2–1	Romulus (8)	283
24	Evesham United (7)	0–1	Stourbridge (7)	262
25	Alfreton Town (6)	6–0	AFC Wulfrunians (10)	353
26	Bedworth United (8)	2–1	Rainworth Miners Welfare (9)	210
27	AFC Telford United (6)	4–1	Pegasus Juniors (9)	1,136
28	Sutton Coldfield Town (8)	3–1	Needham Market (9)	161
29	Hinckley United (6)	2–1	Kirkley & Pakefield (9)	322
30	Lowestoft Town (8)	1–0	Boston United (7)	1,134
31	Redditch United (6)	1–1	Stratford Town (9)	361
replay	Stratford Town (9)	0–2	Redditch United (6)	361
32	Market Drayton Town (8)	1–2	Gainsborough Trinity (6)	205
33	Ilkeston Town (6)	4–1	Mildenhall Town (9)	320
34	Eastwood Town (6)	2–1	Corby Town (6)	484
35	Worcester City (6)	3–0	Bourne Town (9)	555
36	Mickleover Sports (8)	3–4	Solihull Moors (6)	240
37	Rugby Town (7)	1–3	Hucknall Town (7)	224
38	Cambridge City (7)	4–1	Northampton Spencer (9)	243
39	Enfield 1893 (9)	0–5	Chelmsford City (6)	306
40	Walton Casuals (8)	1–0	Selsey (9)	127
41	Canvey Island (7)	0–2	Tooting & Mitcham United (7)	376

Tie	Home team (tier)	Score	Away team (tier)	Att.
42	Heybridge Swifts (8)	1–0	St Albans City (6)	201
43	Burnham (8)	1–1	Aveley (7)	109
replay	Aveley (7)	3–1	Burnham (8)	116
44	Chesham United (8)	4–2	Billericay Town (7)	422
45	Sutton United (7)	3–0	Uxbridge (8)	365
46	Lewes (6)	1–1	Leatherhead (8)	480
replay	Leatherhead (8)	0–1	Lewes (6)	306
47	Bishop's Stortford (6)	2–3	Thurrock (6)	425
48	Hythe Town (9)	2–2	Woking (6)	557
replay	Woking (6)	5–1	Hythe Town (9)	761
49	Tonbridge Angels (7)	4–0	Horsham YMCA (8)	366
50	Dover Athletic (6)	8–0	East Preston (10)	757
51	Boreham Wood (7)	2–4	Wealdstone (7)	249
52	Windsor & Eton (8)	0–1	Farnborough (7)	478
53	Hendon (7)	2–1	Kingstonian (7)	226
54	Potters Bar Town (8)	3–0	Whitstable Town (8)	118
55	Bromley (6)	2–0	Flackwell Heath (9)	442
56	Braintree Town (6)	0–0	Hampton & Richmond Borough (6)	327
replay	Hampton & Richmond Borough (6)	4–1	Braintree Town (6)	261
57	Harefield United (9)	0–2	Maidstone United (7)	323
58	Wingate & Finchley (8)	2–2	Aylesbury (9)	119
replay	Aylesbury (9)	2–1	Wingate & Finchley (8)	87
59	Sittingbourne (8)	2–3	Staines Town (6)	196
60	Worthing (8)	1–2	Dartford (7)	611
61	Welling United (6)	2–0	East Thurrock United (8)	404
62	Walton & Hersham (8)	3–2	Enfield Town (8)	228
63	Ashford Town (Middlesex) (7)	10–0	Badshot Lea (9)	102
64	Slough Town (8)	2–0	Concord Rangers (8)	279
65	Bishop's Cleeve (8)	3–0	Weymouth (6)	249
66	Dorchester Town (6)	4–0	Hungerford Town (8)	307
67	Bashley (7)	1–2	Gloucester City (6)	287
68	Gillingham Town (10)	3–3	Mangotsfield United (8)	505
replay	Mangotsfield United (8)	3–0	Gillingham Town (10)	263
69	Abingdon United (8)	0–0	Cirencester Town (8)	134
replay	Cirencester Town (8)	3–1	Abingdon United (8)	106
70	Willand Rovers (9)	0–5	Bath City (6)	422
71	Almondsbury Town (9)	1–4	AFC Totton (8)	100
72	Weston-super-Mare (6)	0–1	Havant & Waterlooville (6)	298
73	Brackley Town (7)	0–1	Basingstoke Town (6)	326
74	Clevedon Town (7)	1–3	Newport County (6)	623
75	Chippenham Town (7)	4–1	Merthyr Tydfil (7)	533
76	Witney United (9)	1–6	Eastleigh (6)	245
77	VT (8)	0–1	Oxford City (7)	234
78	Bridgwater Town (8)	1–0	Hallen (9)	380
79	Maidenhead United (6)	2–5	Truro City (7)	313
80	Didcot Town (7)	0–2	Paulton Rovers (8)	225

== Third round qualifying ==
The third round qualifying took place on the weekend of 10 October 2009. A total of 80 clubs took part, all having progressed from the second round qualifying. Aylesbury and Coventry Sphinx from Level 9 of English football were the lowest-ranked clubs to qualify for this round of the competition.

Tie	Home team (tier)	Score	Away team (tier)	Att.
1	Salford City (8)	2–2	Blyth Spartans (6)	271
replay	Blyth Spartans (6)	2–1	Salford City (8)	534
2	Fleetwood Town (6)	3–2	Vauxhall Motors (6)	951
3	Northwich Victoria (6)	4–1	Chorley (8)	617
4	Buxton (7)	2–2	Bradford Park Avenue (7)	533
replay	Bradford Park Avenue (7)	0–1	Buxton (7)	375
5	Guiseley (7)	1–1	Kendal Town (7)	405
replay	Kendal Town (7)	1–0	Guiseley (7)	333
6	Workington (6)	3–0	Radcliffe Borough (8)	318
7	Alfreton Town (6)	2–2	Southport (6)	613
replay	Southport (6)	2–1	Alfreton Town (6)	553
8	FC Halifax Town (8)	1–0	Burscough (7)	1,459
9	FC United of Manchester (7)	3–3	Stalybridge Celtic (6)	2,819
replay	Stalybridge Celtic (6)	0–1	FC United of Manchester (7)	1,923
10	Lincoln United (8)	1–1	Frickley Athletic (7)	273
replay	Frickley Athletic (7)	1–1 (1–3 p)	Lincoln United (8)	274
11	Cambridge City (7)	0–5	Hinckley United (6)	466
12	Solihull Moors (6)	0–2	Redditch United (6)	492
13	Stourbridge (7)	0–0	Hucknall Town (7)	384
replay	Hucknall Town (7)	1–6	Stourbridge (7)	324
14	Ilkeston Town (6)	1–1	Eastwood Town (6)	1,128
replay	Eastwood Town (6)	1–3	Ilkeston Town (6)	1,205
15	Bury Town (8)	1–1	Bedford Town (7)	1,003
replay	Bedford Town (7)	3–4	Bury Town (8)	481
16	Coventry Sphinx (9)	0–1	Bedworth United (8)	871
17	Lowestoft Town (8)	0–0	Sutton Coldfield Town (8)	1,210
replay	Sutton Coldfield Town (8)	1–2	Lowestoft Town (8)	201
18	AFC Telford United (6)	0–0	Worcester City (6)	1,459
replay	Worcester City (6)	0–1	AFC Telford United (6)	1,062

Tie	Home team (tier)	Score	Away team (tier)	Att.
19	Nuneaton Town (7)	1–0	Gainsborough Trinity (6)	930
20	Hampton & Richmond Borough (6)	1–1	Aveley (7)	485
replay	Aveley (7)	1–2	Hampton & Richmond Borough (6)	205
21	Dartford (7)	1–4	Chelmsford City (6)	1,830
22	Wealdstone (7)	3–0	Lewes (6)	530
23	Thurrock (6)	4–2	Potters Bar Town (8)	155
24	Hendon (7)	0–0	Ashford Town (Middlesex) (7)	236
replay	Ashford Town (Middlesex) (7)	2–2 (8–9 p)	Hendon (7)	226
25	Tonbridge Angels (7)	0–2	Bromley (6)	944
26	Dover Athletic (6)	2–0	Welling United (6)	1,042
27	Tooting & Mitcham United (7)	3–2	Slough Town (8)	551
28	Sutton United (7)	1–0	Walton & Hersham (8)	530
29	Aylesbury (9)	4–3	Chesham United (8)	448
30	Walton Casuals (8)	0–3	Staines Town (6)	238
31	Woking (6)	2–0	Maidstone United (7)	1,434
32	Heybridge Swifts (8)	0–0	Farnborough (7)	295
replay	Farnborough (7)	3–0	Heybridge Swifts (8)	567
33	Paulton Rovers (8)	1–0	Newport County (6)	703
34	Dorchester Town (6)	1–2	Gloucester City (6)	498
35	Oxford City (7)	2–0	Cirencester Town (8)	311
36	Eastleigh (6)	2–0	Basingstoke Town (6)	681
37	Bishop's Cleeve (8)	1–4	Bath City (6)	398
38	Truro City (7)	1–1	Mangotsfield United (8)	574
replay	Mangotsfield United (8)	1–1 (4–3 p)	Truro City (7)	529
39	AFC Totton (8)	3–2	Bridgwater Town (8)	419
40	Havant & Waterlooville (6)	1–2	Chippenham Town (7)	620

== Fourth round qualifying ==
The fourth round qualifying took place on the weekend of 24 October 2009. A total of 64 clubs took part, 40 having progressed from the third round qualifying and 24 clubs from Conference Premier, forming Level 5 of English football, entering at this stage. Aylesbury from Level 9 of English football was the lowest-ranked club to qualify for this round of the competition.

Tie	Home team (tier)	Score	Away team (tier)	Att.
1	Hinckley United (6)	2–1	Histon (5)	658
2	Nuneaton Town (7)	1–0	Kendal Town (7)	1,103
3	FC Halifax Town (8)	0–1	Wrexham (5)	2,843
4	Gateshead (5)	3–0	Southport (6)	402
5	Workington (6)	0–3	Rushden & Diamonds (5)	724
6	Mansfield Town (5)	3–0	Altrincham (5)	2,410
7	Buxton (7)	0–4	Stourbridge (7)	793
8	Blyth Spartans (6)	0–0	AFC Telford United (6)	642
replay	AFC Telford United (6)	4–0	Blyth Spartans (6)	1,398
9	Ilkeston Town (6)	2–0	Tamworth (5)	699
10	Lincoln United (8)	1–3	Cambridge United (5)	837
11	Kettering Town (5)	1–1	Redditch United (6)	1,400
replay	Redditch United (6)	0–1	Kettering Town (5)	1,101
12	Northwich Victoria (6)	3–0	FC United of Manchester (7)	2,615
13	Barrow (5)	1–1	Chester City (5)	1,579
replay	Chester City (5)	0–4	Barrow (5)	1,287
14	Kidderminster Harriers (5)	0–0	Fleetwood Town (6)	1,257
replay	Fleetwood Town (6)	3–1	Kidderminster Harriers (5)	1,698
15	York City (5)	2–0	Bedworth United (8)	1,869
16	Hendon (7)	0–5	Woking (6)	528

Tie	Home team (tier)	Score	Away team (tier)	Att.
17	Gloucester City (6)	1–1	Lowestoft Town (8)	539
replay	Lowestoft Town (8)	4–2	Gloucester City (6)	2,247
18	Farnborough (7)	0–0	Salisbury City (5)	1,247
replay	Salisbury City (5)	4–2	Farnborough (7)	1,200
19	Mangotsfield United (8)	1–2	Forest Green Rovers (5)	946
20	Crawley Town (5)	1–1	AFC Wimbledon (5)	2,204
replay	AFC Wimbledon (5)	3–1	Crawley Town (5)	2,467
21	Oxford City (7)	2–1	Bury Town (8)	580
22	Bromley (6)	3–0	Ebbsfleet United (5)	1,133
23	Chelmsford City (6)	1–2	Stevenage Borough (5)	1,762
24	Aylesbury (9)	2–4	Wealdstone (7)	682
25	Dover Athletic (6)	3–5	Eastleigh (6)	1,161
26	Hayes & Yeading United (5)	0–1	Staines Town (6)	602
27	Luton Town (5)	3–0	Grays Athletic (5)	2,721
28	Oxford United (5)	2–0	Thurrock (6)	3,296
29	Bath City (6)	3–2	AFC Totton (8)	740
30	Paulton Rovers (8)	3–0	Chippenham Town (7)	931
31	Tooting & Mitcham United (7)	3–3	Eastbourne Borough (5)	687
replay	Eastbourne Borough (5)	3–4	Tooting & Mitcham United (7)	906
32	Hampton & Richmond Borough (6)	1–3	Sutton United (7)	669

== Competition proper ==
Winners from the fourth round qualifying advanced to the first round proper, where clubs from Level 3 and Level 4 of English football, operating in The Football League, first enter the competition. See 2009–10 FA Cup for competition details from the first round proper onwards.
