= 2003–04 Wessex Football League =

Wessex Football League
- Season: 2003–04
- Champions: Winchester City
- Relegated: Blackfield & Langley; Whitchurch United

The 2003–04 Wessex Football League was the 18th season of the Wessex Football League, and the last in which the league consisted of a single division. The league champions for the first time in their history were newcomers Winchester City. There was no promotion to the Southern League, but two clubs were relegated to a new Division Two for 2004–05, as the league was restructured and two new divisions were added.

For sponsorship reasons, the league was known as the Sydenhams Wessex League.

== League table ==
The league consisted of one division of 22 clubs, the same as the previous season, after Eastleigh were promoted to the Southern League and one new club joined:

- Winchester City, joining from the Hampshire League.

Pos	Team	Pld	W	D	L	GF	GA	GD	Pts	Relegation
1	Winchester City (C)	42	35	3	4	151	35	+116	108	
2	Wimborne Town	42	31	6	5	105	45	+60	99	
3	Gosport Borough	42	29	5	8	96	40	+56	92	
4	Lymington & New Milton	42	29	3	10	98	38	+60	90	
5	A.F.C. Newbury	42	26	4	12	94	53	+41	82	
6	Andover	42	25	4	13	100	65	+35	79	
7	Fareham Town	42	24	6	12	71	38	+33	78	
8	A.F.C. Totton	42	18	10	14	76	55	+21	64	
9	Brockenhurst	42	19	7	16	49	74	−25	64	
10	Thatcham Town	42	16	10	16	70	72	−2	58	
11	Christchurch	42	17	6	19	63	62	+1	57	
12	Bemerton Heath Harlequins	42	16	7	19	78	79	−1	55	
13	Hamble A.S.S.C.	42	16	7	19	51	76	−25	55	
14	Cowes Sports	42	15	8	19	51	59	−8	53	
15	B.A.T. Sports	42	13	7	22	57	68	−11	46	
16	Portland United	42	14	4	24	58	86	−28	46	
17	Moneyfields	42	11	8	23	51	83	−32	41	
18	Alton Town	42	12	2	28	55	110	−55	38	
19	Downton	42	8	7	27	43	106	−63	31	
20	Bournemouth	42	8	6	28	41	86	−45	30	
21	Blackfield & Langley (R)	42	7	7	28	51	99	−48	28	Relegated to Division Two
22	Whitchurch United (R)	42	7	5	30	37	117	−80	26	Relegated to Division Two

(C) Champions; (R) Relegated
