= 1994–95 Wessex Football League =

British football season

Wessex Football League
- Season: 1994–95
- Champions: Fleet Town
- Relegated: Horndean

The 1994–95 Wessex Football League was the ninth season of the Wessex Football League. The league champions for the first time in their history were Fleet Town, who were promoted to the Southern League. Founder members Horndean finished bottom and were relegated.

For sponsorship reasons, the league was known as the Jewson Wessex League.

== League table ==
The league consisted of one division of 22 clubs, reduced from the 23 that started the previous season, after Sholing Sports resigned, Whitchurch United were relegated and one new club joined:

- Cowes Sports, joining from the Hampshire League.

Pos	Team	Pld	W	D	L	GF	GA	GD	Pts	Qualification or relegation
1	Fleet Town (C, P)	42	32	4	6	116	43	+73	100	Joined the Southern League
2	Bournemouth	42	31	5	6	109	33	+76	98	
3	Thatcham Town	42	29	9	4	104	44	+60	96	
4	Wimborne Town	42	22	14	6	102	52	+50	80	
5	Bemerton Heath Harlequins	42	24	8	10	75	48	+27	80	
6	Brockenhurst	42	24	4	14	87	59	+28	76	
7	Andover	42	23	5	14	122	69	+53	74	
8	AFC Lymington	42	17	10	15	85	67	+18	61	
9	A.F.C. Totton	42	18	6	18	69	70	−1	60	
10	Gosport Borough	42	17	6	19	83	66	+17	57	
11	Portsmouth Royal Navy	42	16	8	18	65	64	+1	56	
12	Ryde Sports	42	16	6	20	81	88	−7	54	
13	B.A.T. Sports	42	15	8	19	62	82	−20	53	
14	Eastleigh	42	14	9	19	66	73	−7	51	
15	Cowes Sports	42	14	8	20	61	87	−26	50	
16	East Cowes Victoria Athletic	42	13	10	19	65	72	−7	49	
17	Aerostructures Sports & Social	42	12	10	20	60	77	−17	46	
18	Christchurch	42	12	8	22	58	95	−37	44	
19	Swanage Town & Herston	42	11	6	25	49	112	−63	39	
20	Downton	42	7	11	24	45	86	−41	32	
21	Petersfield Town	42	7	5	30	56	161	−105	26	
22	Horndean (R)	42	6	4	32	49	121	−72	22	Relegated to the Hampshire League

(C) Champions; (P) Promoted; (R) Relegated
