= 1987–88 Wessex Football League =

Wessex Football League
- Season: 1987–88
- Champions: Bashley

The 1987–88 Wessex Football League was the second season of the Wessex Football League. The league champions for the second consecutive season were Bashley. There was no promotion or relegation.

== League table ==
The league consisted of one division of 19 clubs, increased from 17 the previous season despite the departures of Road-Sea Southampton and Portals Athletic. Four new clubs joined:

- Christchurch
- East Cowes Victoria Athletic
- Folland Sports, all three promoted from the Hampshire League Division One.
- Wimborne Town, transferred from the Western League.

| Pos | Team | Pld | W | D | L | GF | GA | GD | Pts | Qualification |
|---|---|---|---|---|---|---|---|---|---|---|
| 1 | Bashley (C) | 36 | 26 | 6 | 4 | 91 | 26 | +65 | 84 | |
| 2 | Havant Town | 36 | 24 | 8 | 4 | 91 | 31 | +60 | 80 | |
| 3 | Romsey Town | 36 | 22 | 3 | 11 | 69 | 46 | +23 | 69 | |
| 4 | Newport (IOW) | 36 | 19 | 8 | 9 | 71 | 37 | +34 | 65 | |
| 5 | Christchurch | 36 | 17 | 11 | 8 | 50 | 40 | +10 | 62 | |
| 6 | Wimborne Town | 36 | 17 | 8 | 11 | 68 | 53 | +15 | 59 | |
| 7 | Sholing Sports | 36 | 15 | 12 | 9 | 50 | 45 | +5 | 57 | |
| 8 | A.F.C. Totton | 36 | 16 | 8 | 12 | 52 | 37 | +15 | 56 | |
| 9 | East Cowes Victoria Athletic | 36 | 15 | 10 | 11 | 49 | 32 | +17 | 55 | |
| 10 | Bournemouth | 36 | 14 | 8 | 14 | 55 | 38 | +17 | 50 | |
| 11 | Thatcham Town | 36 | 14 | 7 | 15 | 50 | 53 | −3 | 49 | |
| 12 | Eastleigh | 36 | 13 | 8 | 15 | 36 | 39 | −3 | 47 | |
| 13 | Folland Sports | 36 | 13 | 7 | 16 | 42 | 48 | −6 | 46 | |
| 14 | Horndean | 36 | 12 | 9 | 15 | 52 | 58 | −6 | 45 | |
| 15 | Wellworthy Athletic | 36 | 12 | 8 | 16 | 46 | 53 | −7 | 44 | Merged with Lymington at the end of the season |
| 16 | Portsmouth Royal Navy | 36 | 11 | 4 | 21 | 39 | 72 | −33 | 35 | |
| 17 | Steyning Town | 36 | 6 | 8 | 22 | 24 | 81 | −57 | 26 | Joined the Combined Counties League |
| 18 | Brockenhurst | 36 | 2 | 8 | 26 | 23 | 93 | −70 | 14 | |
| 19 | Lymington | 36 | 0 | 7 | 29 | 27 | 103 | −76 | 7 | Merged with Wellworthy Athletic at the end of the season |

(C) Champions
