= 1995–96 Wessex Football League =

Wessex Football League
- Season: 1995–96
- Champions: Thatcham Town
- Relegated: Swanage Town & Herston

The 1995–96 Wessex Football League was the tenth season of the Wessex Football League. The league champions for the first time in their history were Thatcham Town, but there was no promotion to the Southern League. Swanage Town & Herston finished bottom and were relegated.

For sponsorship reasons, the league was known as the Jewson Wessex League.

== League table ==
The league consisted of one division of 21 clubs, reduced from 22 the previous season, after Fleet Town were promoted to the Southern League, Horndean were relegated and one new club joined:

- Whitchurch United, rejoining from the Hampshire League after being relegated in 1994.

Pos	Team	Pld	W	D	L	GF	GA	GD	Pts	Relegation
1	Thatcham Town (C)	40	28	8	4	73	27	+46	92	
2	AFC Lymington	40	28	7	5	100	31	+69	91	
3	Ryde Sports	40	25	8	7	92	41	+51	83	
4	Eastleigh	40	21	13	6	83	50	+33	76	
5	Christchurch	40	21	8	11	66	49	+17	71	
6	Wimborne Town	40	20	6	14	85	61	+24	66	
7	Bournemouth	40	17	13	10	85	40	+45	64	
8	Bemerton Heath Harlequins	40	18	8	14	67	63	+4	62	
9	Andover	40	18	7	15	101	70	+31	61	
10	East Cowes Victoria Athletic	40	17	8	15	60	60	0	59	
11	Gosport Borough	40	16	9	15	59	58	+1	57	
12	Downton	40	16	6	18	65	73	−8	54	
13	Whitchurch United	40	12	13	15	66	76	−10	49	
14	A.F.C. Totton	40	10	13	17	55	66	−11	43	
15	B.A.T. Sports	40	10	12	18	44	58	−14	42	
16	Cowes Sports	40	11	7	22	38	76	−38	40	
17	Portsmouth Royal Navy	40	10	8	22	52	84	−32	38	
18	Aerostructures Sports & Social	40	9	10	21	41	71	−30	37	
19	Brockenhurst	40	11	4	25	42	74	−32	37	
20	Petersfield Town	40	8	4	28	53	93	−40	28	
21	Swanage Town & Herston (R)	40	6	4	30	32	138	−106	22	Relegated to the Dorset Combination League

(C) Champions; (R) Relegated
