= 1988–89 Wessex Football League =

Wessex Football League
- Season: 1988–89
- Champions: Bashley

The 1988–89 Wessex Football League was the third season of the Wessex Football League. The league champions for the third consecutive season were Bashley, who were subsequently promoted to the Southern League.

For sponsorship reasons, the league was known as the Medisport Wessex League.

== League table ==
The league consisted of one division of 17 clubs, reduced from 19 the previous season after the merger between Wellworthy Athletic and Lymington to form AFC Lymington, and Steyning Town joined the Combined Counties League. One new club joined, being the newly formed merged club:

- AFC Lymington

Pos	Team	Pld	W	D	L	GF	GA	GD	Pts	Qualification
1	Bashley (C, P)	32	26	4	2	87	24	+63	82	Joined the Southern League
2	Havant Town	32	21	8	3	67	26	+41	71	
3	Newport (IOW)	32	20	6	6	67	32	+35	66	
4	Thatcham Town	32	17	7	8	60	26	+34	58	
5	AFC Lymington	32	16	9	7	51	32	+19	57	
6	Wimborne Town	32	14	6	12	59	55	+4	48	
7	Romsey Town	32	9	16	7	47	39	+8	43	
8	East Cowes Victoria Athletic	32	11	8	13	44	48	−4	41	
9	Eastleigh	32	10	10	12	39	34	+5	40	
10	Folland Sports	32	10	10	12	46	42	+4	40	
11	Horndean	32	11	5	16	45	70	−25	38	
12	Bournemouth	32	10	6	16	49	64	−15	36	
13	Christchurch	32	9	7	16	40	71	−31	34	
14	A.F.C. Totton	32	8	9	15	39	58	−19	33	
15	Sholing Sports	32	6	6	20	29	65	−36	24	
16	Brockenhurst	32	3	11	18	17	52	−35	20	
17	Portsmouth Royal Navy	32	5	4	23	25	73	−48	19	

(C) Champions; (P) Promoted
