= 1999–2000 Wessex Football League =

Wessex Football League
- Season: 1999–2000
- Champions: Wimborne Town
- Relegated: East Cowes Victoria Athletic

The 1999–2000 Wessex Football League was the 14th season of the Wessex Football League. The league champions for the third time in their history were Wimborne Town, who won the title on goal difference. There was no promotion to the Southern League, but East Cowes Victoria Athletic finished bottom and were relegated.

For sponsorship reasons, the league was known as the Jewson Wessex League.

== League table ==
The league consisted of one division of 21 clubs, increased from 20 the previous season, after one new club joined:

- Andover, rejoining after just one season in the Southern Football League, having resigned for financial reasons.

Pos	Team	Pld	W	D	L	GF	GA	GD	Pts	Relegation
1	Wimborne Town (C)	40	32	4	4	126	33	+93	100	
2	Lymington & New Milton	40	31	7	2	115	27	+88	100	
3	Andover	40	25	7	8	147	60	+87	82	
4	A.F.C. Totton	40	24	8	8	93	30	+63	80	
5	B.A.T. Sports	40	24	8	8	88	48	+40	80	
6	Moneyfields	40	22	9	9	76	64	+12	75	
7	Eastleigh	40	20	8	12	67	46	+21	68	
8	A.F.C. Newbury	40	17	12	11	67	51	+16	63	
9	Cowes Sports	40	17	11	12	73	55	+18	62	
10	Bemerton Heath Harlequins	40	17	9	14	75	66	+9	60	
11	Fareham Town	40	14	14	12	72	71	+1	56	
12	Christchurch	40	16	7	17	68	67	+1	55	
13	Thatcham Town	40	15	7	18	62	69	−7	52	
14	Gosport Borough	40	8	12	20	40	70	−30	36	
15	Downton	40	10	6	24	74	113	−39	36	
16	Hamble A.S.S.C.	40	7	11	22	44	89	−45	32	
17	Whitchurch United	40	7	10	23	53	89	−36	31	
18	Brockenhurst	40	7	7	26	43	114	−71	28	
19	Bournemouth	40	7	8	25	54	110	−56	27 (Note: Bournemouth had two points deducted.)	
20	Portsmouth Royal Navy	40	5	10	25	47	114	−67	25	
21	East Cowes Victoria Athletic (R)	40	5	5	30	43	141	−98	20	Relegated to the Hampshire League

(C) Champions; (R) Relegated
