= 1992–93 Wessex Football League =

Wessex Football League
- Season: 1992–93
- Champions: AFC Lymington
- Relegated: Romsey Town

The 1992–93 Wessex Football League was the seventh season of the Wessex Football League. The league champions for the first time were AFC Lymington. There was no promotion to the Southern League this season, but founder members Romsey Town were relegated.

For sponsorship reasons, the league was known as the Jewson Wessex League.

== League table ==
The league consisted of one division of 21 clubs, increased from 19 the previous season after two new clubs joined:

- Gosport Borough, relegated from the Southern League.
- Whitchurch United, joining from the Hampshire League.

Pos	Team	Pld	W	D	L	GF	GA	GD	Pts	Relegation
1	AFC Lymington (C)	40	30	7	3	111	27	+84	97	
2	Wimborne Town	40	30	5	5	101	27	+74	95	
3	Bemerton Heath Harlequins	40	27	7	6	77	33	+44	88	
4	Thatcham Town	40	24	10	6	104	45	+59	82	
5	Gosport Borough	40	20	12	8	83	48	+35	72	
6	Ryde Sports	40	21	4	15	79	61	+18	67	
7	Bournemouth	40	18	11	11	83	58	+25	65	
8	Fleet Town	40	17	10	13	79	51	+28	61	
9	Eastleigh	40	17	9	14	68	54	+14	60	
10	Brockenhurst	40	17	7	16	60	56	+4	58	
11	Horndean	40	15	9	16	63	66	−3	54	
12	Aerostructures Sports & Social	40	13	14	13	55	57	−2	53	
13	Christchurch	40	14	7	19	60	73	−13	49	
14	Swanage Town & Herston	40	11	11	18	65	78	−13	44	
15	Whitchurch United	40	12	6	22	57	80	−23	42	
16	A.F.C. Totton	40	12	6	22	56	82	−26	42	
17	Portsmouth Royal Navy	40	10	10	20	52	83	−31	40	
18	B.A.T. Sports	40	9	9	22	59	83	−24	36	
19	Sholing Sports	40	7	10	23	46	94	−48	31	
20	East Cowes Victoria Athletic	40	8	4	28	52	106	−54	28	
21	Romsey Town (R)	40	3	2	35	20	168	−148	11	Relegated to the Hampshire League

(C) Champions; (R) Relegated
