= 1989–90 Wessex Football League =

Wessex Football League
- Season: 1989–90
- Champions: Romsey Town

The 1989–90 Wessex Football League was the fourth season of the Wessex Football League. The league champions for the first time were Romsey Town. Runners-up Newport (IOW) moved up to the Southern League after this season.

For sponsorship reasons, the league was known as the Medisport Wessex League.

== League table ==
The league consisted of one division of 19 clubs, increased from 17 the previous season despite Bashley having joined the Southern League. Three new clubs joined:

- B.A.T. Sports, joining from the Hampshire League.
- Bemerton Heath Harlequins, a merger of Bemerton Athletic (Wiltshire League), Moon F.C. (Salisbury & District League) and Bemerton Boys (Mid-Wilts League).
- Fleet Town, joining from the Chiltonian League.

Pos	Team	Pld	W	D	L	GF	GA	GD	Pts	Qualification
1	Romsey Town (C)	36	25	6	5	84	31	+53	81	
2	Newport (IOW) (P)	36	24	7	5	82	29	+53	79	Joined the Southern League
3	B.A.T. Sports	36	21	7	8	74	35	+39	70	
4	Wimborne Town	36	20	8	8	83	48	+35	68	
5	AFC Lymington	36	19	8	9	68	44	+24	65	
6	A.F.C. Totton	36	17	8	11	58	45	+13	59	
7	Thatcham Town	36	15	12	9	56	45	+11	57	
8	Bemerton Heath Harlequins	36	16	8	12	61	47	+14	56	
9	Sholing Sports	36	16	8	12	57	51	+6	56	
10	Bournemouth	36	15	9	12	69	70	−1	54	
11	Havant Town	36	13	8	15	49	50	−1	47	
12	Folland Sports	36	13	6	17	42	47	−5	45	
13	East Cowes Victoria Athletic	36	11	10	15	47	54	−7	43	
14	Eastleigh	36	10	11	15	60	66	−6	41	
15	Christchurch	36	10	9	17	47	59	−12	39	
16	Horndean	36	10	6	20	56	75	−19	36	
17	Brockenhurst	36	5	8	23	35	98	−63	23	
18	Fleet Town	36	5	5	26	22	86	−64	20	
19	Portsmouth Royal Navy	36	4	2	30	38	108	−70	14	

(C) Champions; (P) Promoted
