= 1996–97 Wessex Football League =

Wessex Football League
- Season: 1996–97
- Champions: AFC Lymington
- Relegated: Petersfield Town

The 1996–97 Wessex Football League was the 11th season of the Wessex Football League. The league champions for the second time in their history were AFC Lymington, after remaining unbeaten for the whole season. There was no promotion to the Southern League, but Petersfield Town finished bottom and were relegated.

For sponsorship reasons, the league was known as the Jewson Wessex League.

== League table ==
The league consisted of one division of 21 clubs, the same as the previous season, after Swanage Town & Herston were relegated and one new club joined:

- Romsey Town, rejoining from the Hampshire League after being relegated in 1993.

Pos	Team	Pld	W	D	L	GF	GA	GD	Pts	Relegation
1	AFC Lymington (C)	40	35	5	0	112	22	+90	110	
2	Wimborne Town	40	26	7	7	97	42	+55	85	
3	Thatcham Town	40	26	5	9	91	45	+46	79 (Note: Thatcham Town had four points deducted.)	
4	Ryde Sports	40	25	4	11	77	50	+27	79	
5	Bemerton Heath Harlequins	40	23	9	8	69	45	+24	78	
6	Andover	40	19	12	9	80	42	+38	69	
7	Eastleigh	40	19	8	13	71	56	+15	65	
8	Downton	40	18	7	15	72	70	+2	61	
9	Cowes Sports	40	15	14	11	65	55	+10	59	
10	Portsmouth Royal Navy	40	16	4	20	65	79	−14	51 (Note: Portsmouth Royal Navy had one point deducted.)	
11	Gosport Borough	40	15	5	20	56	66	−10	50	
12	Aerostructures Sports & Social	40	13	9	18	45	66	−21	48	
13	Bournemouth	40	14	5	21	50	72	−22	47	
14	Brockenhurst	40	13	7	20	54	73	−19	46	
15	Whitchurch United	40	12	7	21	58	81	−23	43	
16	Christchurch	40	13	4	23	49	72	−23	43	
17	East Cowes Victoria Athletic	40	10	7	23	53	72	−19	37	
18	Romsey Town	40	10	7	23	52	94	−42	37	
19	B.A.T. Sports	40	8	9	23	43	74	−31	33	
20	A.F.C. Totton	40	8	8	24	54	87	−33	32	
21	Petersfield Town (R)	40	8	5	27	42	92	−50	29	Relegated to the Hampshire League

(C) Champions; (R) Relegated
