= 1997–98 Wessex Football League =

Wessex Football League
- Season: 1997–98
- Champions: AFC Lymington
- Relegated: Romsey Town

The 1997–98 Wessex Football League was the 12th season of the Wessex Football League. The league champions for the second consecutive season and the third time in their history were AFC Lymington, before their merger with New Milton Town of the Hampshire League. Runners-up Andover were promoted to the Southern League as Lymington's ground was not of the required standard for promotion. Romsey Town finished bottom and were relegated, and Ryde Sports resigned during the season.

For sponsorship reasons, the league was known as the Jewson Wessex League.

== League table ==
The league consisted of one division of 21 clubs, the same as the previous season, after Petersfield Town were relegated and one new club joined:

- A.F.C. Newbury, joining from the Hampshire League.

Pos	Team	Pld	W	D	L	GF	GA	GD	Pts	Qualification or relegation
1	AFC Lymington (C)	38	29	5	4	94	27	+67	92	Merged with New Milton Town at the end of the season
2	Andover (P)	38	24	9	5	99	46	+53	81	Joined the Southern League
3	A.F.C. Newbury	38	22	7	9	72	35	+37	73	
4	Eastleigh	38	20	11	7	74	31	+43	71	
5	Bemerton Heath Harlequins	38	19	11	8	69	38	+31	68	
6	Cowes Sports	38	20	6	12	67	51	+16	66	
7	Wimborne Town	38	18	9	11	89	63	+26	63	
8	A.F.C. Totton	38	15	10	13	58	41	+17	55	
9	Bournemouth	38	16	7	15	64	68	−4	55	
10	Thatcham Town	38	16	6	16	64	54	+10	54	
11	Christchurch	38	15	6	17	55	69	−14	51	
12	East Cowes Victoria Athletic	38	13	11	14	46	42	+4	50	
13	Portsmouth Royal Navy	38	13	7	18	64	79	−15	46	
14	B.A.T. Sports	38	12	7	19	60	82	−22	43	
15	Gosport Borough	38	9	10	19	48	65	−17	37	
16	Aerostructures Sports & Social	38	9	10	19	50	77	−27	37	
17	Brockenhurst	38	9	9	20	43	83	−40	36	
18	Downton	38	7	10	21	36	66	−30	31	
19	Whitchurch United	38	7	8	23	37	78	−41	29	
20	Romsey Town (R)	38	5	5	28	40	134	−94	20	Relegated to the Hampshire League
21	Ryde Sports	0	0	0	0	0	0	0	0	Resigned during the season, record expunged (Note: Ryde Sports resigned in December 1997 after 17 matches and their record was expunged. The club later folded.)

(C) Champions; (P) Promoted; (R) Relegated
