= Tim Coak =

English footballer

Personal information
- Full name: Timothy David Thomas Coak
- Date of birth: 16 January 1958 (age 68)
- Place of birth: Southampton, England
- Height: 5 ft 5 in (1.65 m)
- Position: Full-back

Youth career
- Hampton Park School
- Southampton Schools
- 1974–1976: Southampton

Senior career*
Years	Team	Apps	(Gls)
1976–1979	Southampton	4	(0)
1979–1982	Salisbury		(2)
1982–1984	Waterlooville		
1984–1989	Gosport Borough		
1989	Bashley		
1989–1991	Gosport Borough		
1991–1992	Eastleigh		
1992–1994	Aerostructures		
1994–1995	Romsey Town		
1995	Fareham Town Veterans		
- * Club domestic league appearances and goals

Timothy David Thomas Coak (born 16 January 1958) is an English retired professional footballer who played as a defender. A full-back who could play on the left or the right, Coak began his career with Southampton and later played for Salisbury City, Waterlooville, Gosport Borough, Bashley, Eastleigh, Aerostructures, Romsey Town and Fareham Town Veterans.

== Career ==
Tim Coak initially joined the Southampton F.C. Academy as an apprentice in July 1974 at the age of 16, before signing professional terms in January 1976. He made his debut for the club on 26 April 1977 in a Football League Second Division match against Orient as a replacement for David Peach, who was away on national duty with the England under-21 side. Coak played a further five games for Southampton in the 1977–78 season, before leaving the club in 1979.

After leaving Southampton, Coak chose to play semi-professionally for a number of non-league sides in the Hampshire area: Salisbury (1979–1982), Waterlooville (1982–1984), Gosport Borough (1984–1989 and 1989–1991), Bashley (1989), Eastleigh (1991–1992), Aerostructures (1992–1994), Romsey Town (1994–1995) and Fareham Town Veterans (1995). After retiring, he worked in a number of local coaching roles, as well as with the Southampton Centre of Excellence.

== Bibliography ==
- Chalk, Gary; Holley, Duncan; Bull, David (2013), All the Saints: A Complete Players' Who's Who of Southampton FC, Hagiology Publishing, ISBN 978-0992686406
- Holley, Duncan; Chalk, Gary; Bull, David (2003), In That Number: A Post-War Chronicle of Southampton FC, Hagiology Publishing, ISBN 978-0953447435
