= HTFC =

HTFC may refer to one of the following British football clubs:

- Halifax Town A.F.C.
- Halstead Town F.C.
- Harlow Town F.C.
- Harpenden Town F.C.
- Harrogate Town F.C.
- Havant Town F.C.
- Hednesford Town F.C.
- Hertford Town F.C.
- Higham Town F.C.
- Hitchin Town F.C.
- Holywell Town F.C.
- Horley Town F.C.
- Hucknall Town F.C.
- Huddersfield Town F.C.
- Huntingdon Town F.C.
