= Wessex Football League =

English football league

- Founded: 1986
- Country: England
- Divisions: Premier Division; Division One
- Number of clubs: 42; 21 (Premier Division); 21 (Division One)
- Level on pyramid: Levels 9–10
- Feeder to: Southern League; Isthmian League
- Promotion to: Level 8 Southern League Division One South; Isthmian League Division One South Central
- Relegation to: Hampshire Premier League; Dorset Premier Football League; Wiltshire Football League
- Domestic cup: Wessex League Cup
- Current champions: A.F.C. Stoneham (Premier Division); Fleetlands (Division One) (2025–26)
- Website: Wessex League
- Current: 2026–27 Season

The Wessex Football League is an English regional men's football league in southern England. Its members are primarily from Hampshire and Dorset, but clubs from adjoining counties such as Wiltshire, Berkshire, Surrey, and the Isle of Wight are also eligible. The Premier Division is one of the sixteen recognised leagues to form the ninth level of the English football league system (known as Step 5 of the National League System), and Division One is one of seventeen recognised leagues at level 10 (Step 6).

Champions of the Wessex League who meet the relevant ground and financial requirements are eligible for promotion to the Southern League Division One South or Isthmian League Division One South Central.

== History ==
In the summer of 1986, the formation of a Wessex League was discussed. It was proposed to draw clubs from the Hampshire, Dorset, Berks and Bucks, Sussex and Wiltshire FAs. After long discussions the full Football Association approved the league, with the 1986-87 season featuring 17 teams in the league.

Bashley were first champions of the new league, with Brockenhurst finishing last. The 1987–88 season saw the number of teams increase from 17 to 19. Four teams joined the league, but two of the founding teams, Road-Sea Southampton and Portals Athletic, left in unfortunate circumstances.

In its third year of existence, the league was gaining in prestige and this was reflected by the fact that 17 of the 19 clubs remained in the league. 1990–91 saw the league reach previously untouched heights as 20 clubs participated.

In 2004, it absorbed most of the clubs from its feeder league, the Hampshire League, which formed a new Division Two and Division Three. In 2006 the divisions were renamed as the Premier Division and Divisions One and Two. At the end of the 2006–07 season, Division Two was disbanded, and most of the clubs formed a new Hampshire Premier League.

== Current members ==
=== Premier Division ===
Map showing the location of teams in Wessex Football League, Premier Division in 2023–24

Club	Home ground
Andover New Street	The DH Property Services Stadium
Baffins Milton Rovers	PMC Stadium
Bashley	Veho Community Stadium
Bemerton Heath Harlequins	A-Class Arena
Bournemouth	Victoria Park
Brockenhurst	Meadens Skoda Arena
Christchurch	Hurn Bridge
Cowes Sports	Westwood Park
Downton	Brian Whitehead Sports Ground
East Cowes Victoria Athletic	Beatrice Avenue
Fareham Town	Cams Alders
Fleetlands	Powder Monkey Park
Hamble Club	Hamble Community Facility
Hamworthy Recreation	The BJM Stadium
Horndean	Five Heads Park
Hythe & Dibden	Hythe Garage Stadium
Laverstock & Ford	Church Road
Millbrook	Test Park
Petersfield Town	The SmartSpaces Stadium
Sherborne Town	The GMS Windows Arena
Sturminster Newton United	Barnett's Field

The area covered by the Wessex League is coloured in yellow.

=== Division One ===
Club	Home ground
AFC Aldermaston	Waterside Park
Alresford Town	Alrebury Park
Amesbury Town	Bonnymead Park
Ash United	Shawfield Stadium
Blandford United	The Recreation Ground
Colden Common	The Charters Community Stadium
Cove	Oak Farm
Fawley	Waterside Sports & Social Club
Folland Sports	The Arrow Arena
Frimley Green	The KBO Stadium
Hamworthy United	The County Ground
Hedge End Rangers	Mortgage Decisions Stadium
Kintbury Rangers	The Recreation Ground
Lymington Town	The Sports Ground
New Milton Town	The M.A Hart Stadium
Newport (IOW)	WightFibre Park
Ringwood Town	Long Lane
Romsey Town	AEC Protection Ground
Sandhurst Town	Sandhurst Memorial Park
Totton & Eling	Miller Park
Whitchurch United	Longmeadow

== Past winners ==
Season	Champions
1986–87	Bashley
1987–88	Bashley
1988–89	Bashley
1989–90	Romsey Town
1990–91	Havant Town
1991–92	Wimborne Town
1992–93	AFC Lymington
1993–94	Wimborne Town
1994–95	Fleet Town
1995–96	Thatcham Town
1996–97	AFC Lymington
1997–98	AFC Lymington
1998–99	Lymington & New Milton
1999–2000	Wimborne Town
2000–01	Andover
2001–02	Andover
2002–03	Eastleigh
2003–04	Winchester City

In 2004, the league expanded to three divisions.

Season	Division One	Division Two	Division Three
2004–05	Lymington & New Milton	Lymington Town	Colden Common
2005–06	Winchester City	Locks Heath	Paulsgrove

In 2006, the divisions were renumbered, with the top division being renamed the Premier Division.

Season	Premier Division	Division One	Division Two
2006–07	Gosport Borough	Hayling United	Fleetlands

After the 2006-07 season, Division Two was discontinued.

Season	Premier Division	Division One
2007–08	A.F.C. Totton	Tadley Calleva
2008–09	Poole Town	Totton & Eling
2009–10	Poole Town	Hamble A.S.S.C.
2010–11	Poole Town	Downton
2011–12	Winchester City	Verwood Town
2012–13	Blackfield & Langley	Brockenhurst
2013–14	Sholing	Petersfield Town
2014–15	Petersfield Town	Team Solent
2015–16	Salisbury	Portland United
2016–17	Portland United	Hamble Club
2017–18	Blackfield & Langley	Christchurch
2018–19	Sholing	AFC Stoneham
2019–20	Season abandoned (coronavirus pandemic)	
2020–21	Season abandoned (lockdown restrictions)	
2021–22	Hamworthy United	Bemerton Heath Harlequins
2022–23	Horndean	Andover New Street
2023–24	Moneyfields	Hamworthy Recreation
2024–25	AFC Portchester	New Milton Town
2025–26	AFC Stoneham	Fleetlands

== Wessex League Cup ==
The Wessex League Cup, or Velocity Wessex League Cup for sponsor purposes, is a domestic cup which all the Wessex League teams participate in.

=== Wessex League Cup winners ===
- 1986–87: Road Sea Southampton
- 1987–88: East Cowes Victoria Athletic
- 1988–89: A.F.C. Lymington
- 1989–90: A.F.C. Totton
- 1990–91: Thatcham Town
- 1991–92: Thatcham Town
- 1992–93: Gosport Borough
- 1993–94: Wimborne Town
- 1994–95: Thatcham Town
- 1995–96: Downton
- 1996–97: Thatcham Town
- 1997–98: Aerostructures Sports & Social
- 1998–99: Cowes Sports
- 1999–2000: Wimborne Town
- 2000–01: (no competition held)
- 2001–02: Andover
- 2002–03: A.F.C. Totton
- 2003–04: Winchester City
- 2004–05: Hamworthy United
- 2005–06: A.F.C. Totton
- 2006–07: Lymington Town
- 2007–08: Wimborne Town
- 2008–09: VT
- 2009–10: Bemerton Heath Harlequins
- 2010–11: Bournemouth
- 2011–12: Christchurch
- 2012–13: Alresford Town
- 2013–14: Alresford Town
- 2014–15: A.F.C. Portchester
- 2015–16: Team Solent
- 2016–17: Sholing
- 2017–18: A.F.C. Portchester
- 2018–19: Baffins Milton Rovers
- 2019–20: (not awarded)
- 2020–21: Hamworthy United
- 2021–22: Shaftesbury
- 2022–23: Baffins Milton Rovers
- 2023–24: Hamble Club
- 2024–25: A.F.C. Portchester
- 2025–26: Hamble Club
