= Romsey Town F.C. =

Association football club in England

Coordinates: 50°59′14″N 1°29′25″W

Romsey Town
- Full name: Romsey Town Football Club
- Nickname: The Town
- Founded: 1886
- Ground: The AEC Protection Ground, Romsey
- Capacity: 1,500
- Chairman: Jamie Ricketts
- Manager: Andy Samuels
- League: Wessex League Division One
- 2025–26: Wessex League Division One, 8th of 22
- Website: http://www.romseytownfc.com
Home colours	Away colours

Romsey Town Football Club is a football club based in Romsey, Hampshire, England.

The club competes in the Wessex League Division One which is the tenth tier of English football. They are affiliated to the Hampshire Football Association and are an FA chartered Standard club

Founded in 1886, the club have spent most of their existence in the 9th and 10th tiers of English Football but have once in their history reached the Fourth Qualifying Round of the FA Cup in the 1990–91 season. They were among the founding members of the Wessex League in 1986. The club plays at the AEC Protection Ground (previously known as the Bypass Ground) which they moved to in 1956.

== History ==
Romsey Town were founded in 1886 when a meeting took place at the Town Hall "to consider the desirability of forming a football club in the town". Initially, they played at Alma Road and in 1889 began playing in local league football where they had successful spells in a number of competitions before joining the Southampton League as founder members in 1908.

The 1920's were a good decade for Romsey Town, and after winning the Hampshire Intermediate Cup and Senior League title they gained entry into the Hampshire League but struggled in the West Division and returned to local football after just one season. In 1930, Romsey moved to Priestlands, which is now Romsey School, and returned to the county league where they were placed in Division 2. Here the club were better prepared as they went on to produce some of their best attacking sides, featuring well in both league and cup competitions. Financial problems forced them to drop-out in 1937 and return to local football.

After World War II, Romsey Town reformed and in 1946 returned to the Hampshire League where they won promotion from Division 3 as runners-up. After a series of steady seasons, they were relegated in 1956. That same year they then moved to their current home, The Bypass Ground. Romsey continued in Division 3 but the early 1960's saw a further decline in fortune, eventually being relegated in 1964. Because the football pyramid was not yet in existence, the club were forced to drop right down to replace their reserves in Junior Division 1 of the Southampton League and it was not until 1968 that they won promotion back to the senior section.

The 1970's saw Romsey re-surface out of the doldrums with three successive promotions and a Southampton Senior Cup triumph in 1974. This saw the club regain their Hampshire League status in 1975 where they promptly won the Division 4 title at the first attempt. They proceeded to end the decade on a high note, again winning promotion and the Hampshire Intermediate Cup in 1978, then a year later, in arguably their finest hour they won the Division 2 title and unexpectedly defeated Farnborough Town 1–0 in the Hampshire Senior Cup final played at The Dell.

The 1980's saw Romsey consolidate in Division 1 before becoming founder members of the Wessex League in 1986. Here they soon became a strong force, and after some encouraging campaigns, they clinched the title in 1990 and enjoyed numerous good cup runs, most notably in 1990 when they lost 1–2 at home to Littlehampton Town in the 4th Qualifying Round of the FA Cup.

A change of personnel saw Romsey fall into decline, and after a nightmare season in 1993 they were relegated back to Division 1 of the Hampshire League, from where they were again relegated. This was despite the club running an extremely successful Youth System with Phil Glass' Under 18's winning the Hants Youth League and reaching Quarter final of FA Youth Cup where they were narrowly beaten by Yeovil Town's full-time Apprentices, The team captained by Paul Mabey were expected to boost the club for years to come but reluctance by senior management to pick youth meant players were lost for several years, Despite these setbacks, Romsey bounced back and within two years with high-profile local players returning such as Mabey, Paul Glass, Glenn Burnett, Peter Kelly, Stuart Carpenter & James Kirby the good times returned to the Bypass Ground and they won the Southampton Senior Cup and promotion back to the Wessex League. However, they struggled in what had become a much harder competition. In 1998, Romsey were again relegated back to the Hampshire League and a series of managers and large turn-over of players saw them slip into the third division. In 2003, the club hit an all-time low when they finished rock bottom. Fortunately, they were re-elected, and have since enjoyed a remarkable upturn in fortunes.

In 2004 the Wessex League absorbed the original Hampshire League and due to their facilities Romsey were placed in Division 1 and former club stalwart Trevor Holmes became manager, he kept the club together finishing mid table. 2005–6 season Trevor Holmes was joined by Julian Walters from Hamble Club FC, who brought a large number of players to Romsey, and saw them consolidate again in Division 1. 2006-7 saw Romsey gain promotion to the Premier division with Holmes and Walters at the helm. 2007-8 saw Glenn Burnett and Lee Harrison join the managerial team eventually taking the managers roles later that season, with Holmes and Walters stepping aside having consolidated the club. Now with an encouraging 2007–08 season with new manager pairing Glenn Burnett and Lee Harrison at the helm Romsey's team spirit was at an all-time high. The team were performing well on the pitch as well with two consecutive mid-table finishes really consolidating Romsey's position in the Wessex Premier League. At the end of the 2009–10 season, Glenn Burnett decided to step down blaming his decision to leave on how much he had to do at the club. Assistant manager Lee Harrison soon followed suit, as well as a large percentage of the squad that Glenn had been crafting over the last few seasons. In the 2010–11 season, backed by the new management duo of Wayne Mew and Stuart Long, began with many trials as Romsey searched to rebuild a team. In the end, Romsey finished in 16th position in the league despite a lack of players. One of the high points of the season was Romsey's longest-serving and most prolific player in their history, Simon De'ath, who finished with 25 league goals, placing him seventh in the goalscorer charts.

Wayne Mew continued at the helm for the 2011–12 and managed to keep hold of striker Simon De'ath despite interest from numerous other clubs.

Following one of Romsey's most successful seasons, where Simon De'ath was once again top scorer, after finishing in 8th place alongside two cup quarter finals, manager Wayne Mew decided to resign from the Bypass Ground. Francis Benali also resigned from the post as reserve team boss.

On Thursday 31 May, Romsey appointed Danny Barker as manager taking over from former boss Wayne Mew. In his first full season in charge of the club, the side finished second bottom in the league but were spared relegation after Hayling United were relegated due to ground grading issues.

On 22 October 2013, manager Danny Barker resigned from his post with the club sitting in 22nd place in the league. Carl Bennett and later John McFarlane took over as co-managers but on 30 April 2014, James Phillips was appointed the new head coach, after the club finished bottom of the league.

The club then appointed Andy Samuels as Manager and whilst they finished second bottom in 2014/15, there has been steady improvement, with mid table finishes in 2015/16 and 2016/17, leading to a promotion challenges in 2017/18 and 2018/ 19 which resulted in a sixth and fourth-place finishes. During the summer Andy Samuels stepped down and has been replaced by Chris McGinn, a former professional footballer and international coach.

In 2023 Romsey announced a new women's football team.

In May 2026, the club announced a merger with the existing Romsey Town Youth Football Club which led to men's team adopting the colours of the youth side including the use of a new badge.

== Ground ==
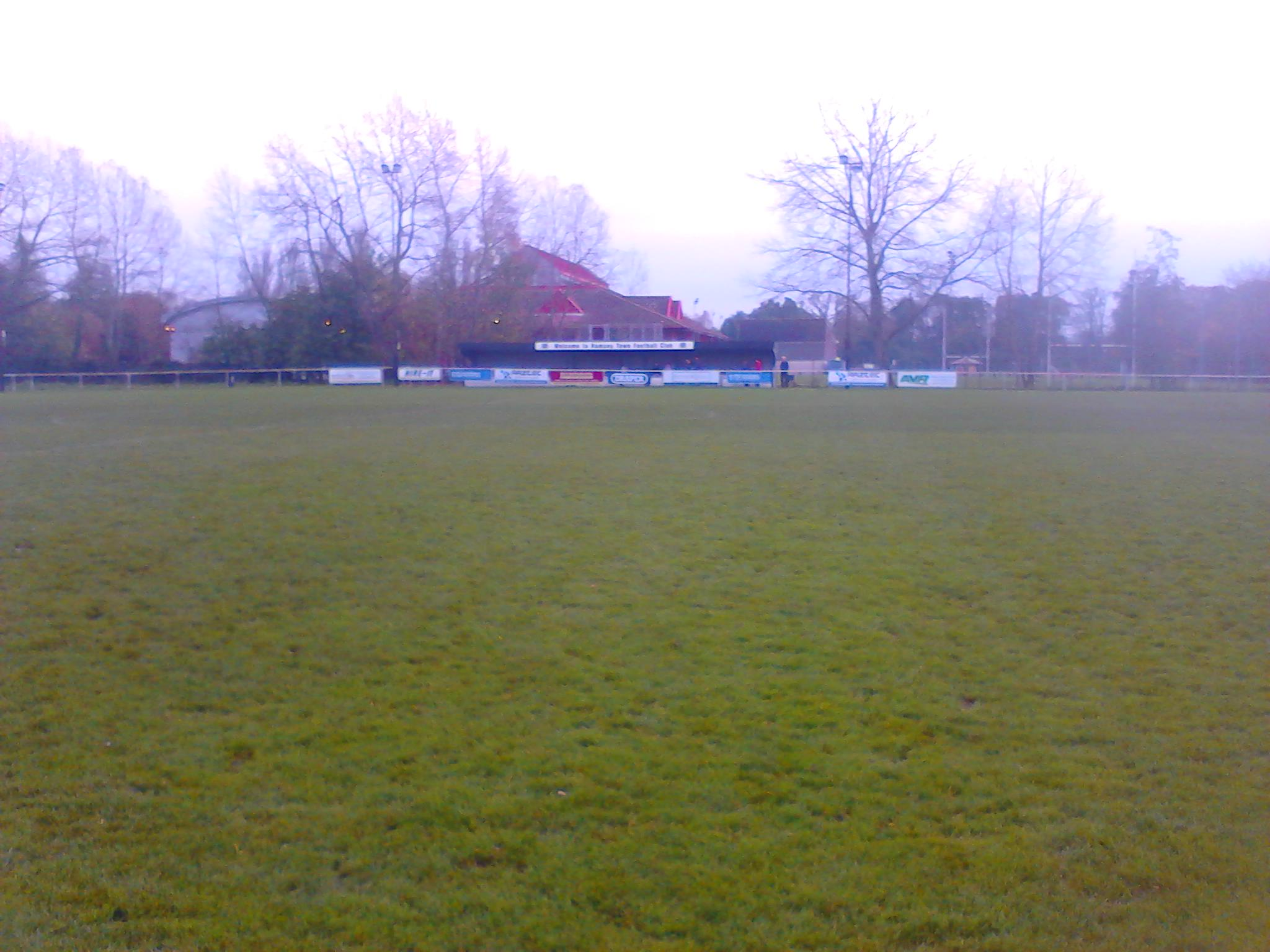
The Bypass Ground

Romsey Town play their home games at The AEC Protection Ground, South Front, Romsey, SO51 8GJ.

Romsey Town first played on fields which have since been built on at Alma Road but now play their home matches at the AEC Protection Ground (previously known as the Bypass Ground) and have done so since 1956 after they were successful in their application for a 99-year lease on the area of the land the ground is built on from nearby Broadlands.

The ground now has a stand on the far side of the pitch, a smaller stand on the near side as well as a fence which covers a large section of the near side. The ground also has recently re-built changing rooms, hospitality room, refreshments bar and a club house which includes a bar.

== Honours ==
- Wessex League
  - Champions 1989–90
- Hampshire League
  - Division 2 Champions 1978–79, Runners-up 1994-95
  - Division 3 Runners-up 1946–47, 1977–78 & 2003–04
  - Division 4 Champions 1975–76
- Hampshire Football Association
  - Senior Cup Winners 1978–79, Finalists 1948–49
  - Intermediate Cup Winners 1926–26, 1930–31 & 1977–78
  - Junior Cup Winners 1900–01, 1909–10 & 1923–24, Finalists 1898–99 & 1899–1900
  - Russell Cotes Cup Finalists 1932–33 & 1988–89
- Southampton Football Association
  - Senior Cup Winners 1973–74 & 1994–95, Finalists 1927–28, 1928–29, 1929–30 & 2007–08
  - Junior Cup Winners 1922–23
  - Veterans Cup Winners 2016-17
- Southampton League
  - Premier Division Champions 1980–81 & 1983–84
  - Senior Division 1 Champions 1926–27, Runners-up 1973-74 and 1976–77
  - Senior Division 2 Champions 1972–73, Runners-up 1968–69
  - West Division Champions 1951–52
  - Romsey Division Champions 1927–28
  - Junior Division 3 Runners-up 1924–25
  - Junior Division 4 Champions 1974–75
  - Veterans 'B' Division Champions 2016-17
  - Veterans League Cup Winners 2016-17
- Other
  - Salisbury & District League Champions 1898–99
  - South Hants League Champions 1900–01
  - Winchester & District League Champions 1921–22
  - Eastleigh & District League Champions 1922–23, 1923–24 & 1928–29. Runners-up 1921–22, 1927–28 & 1929–30
  - Romsey Hospital Cup Winners 1933–34

== Playing Records ==
=== League history (since 1930) ===
Season	Division	Position	Notes
1930–31	Hampshire League Division 2	2/13	Not promoted
1931-32	Hampshire League Division 2	8/14	
1932-33	Hampshire League Division 2	3/13	
1933-34	Hampshire League Division 2	7/12	
1934-35	Hampshire League Division 2	8/16	
1935-36	Hampshire League Division 2	11/15	
1936-37	Hampshire League Division 2	9/16	Left competition
1937-39	Southampton League		
1946–47	Hampshire League Division 3	2/12	Promoted
1947–48	Hampshire League Division 2	2/12	Not promoted
1948–49	Hampshire League Division 2	5/14	
1949–50	Hampshire League Division 2	6/14	
1950–51	Hampshire League Division 2	7/14	
1951–52	Hampshire League Division 2	4/14	
1952–53	Hampshire League Division 2	8/14	
1953–54	Hampshire League Division 2	11/14	
1954–55	Hampshire League Division 2	8/14	
1955–56	Hampshire League Division 2	15/16	Relegated
1956–57	Hampshire League Division 3	5/16	
1957–58	Hampshire League Division 3	13/16	
1958–59	Hampshire League Division 3	14/16	
1959–60	Hampshire League Division 3	5/16	Promoted
1960–61	Hampshire League Division 2	15/16	Relegated
1961–62	Hampshire League Division 3	12/16	
1962–63	Hampshire League Division 3	12/16	
1963–64	Hampshire League Division 3	15/16	Relegated
1964-75	Southampton League		
1975–76	Hampshire League Division 4	1/16	Promoted
1976–77	Hampshire League Division 3	13/16	
1977–78	Hampshire League Division 3	2/16	Promoted
1978-79	Hampshire League Division 2	1/16	Promoted
1979-80	Hampshire League Division 1	4/16	
1980-81	Hampshire League Division 1	8/20	
1981-82	Hampshire League Division 1	16/20	
1982-83	Hampshire League Division 1	11/20	
1983–84	Hampshire League Division 1	15/20	
1984–85	Hampshire League Division 1	6/20	
1985–86	Hampshire League Division 1	15/20	Left competition
1986–87	Wessex League	16/17	Founder members
1987-88	Wessex League	3/19	
1988-89	Wessex League	7/17	
1989–90	Wessex League	1/19	Champions
1990–91	Wessex League	4/20	
1991–92	Wessex League	4/19	
1992–93	Wessex League	21/21	Relegated
1993–94	Hampshire League Division 1	19/20	Relegated
1994–95	Hampshire League Division 2	2/17	Promoted
1995–96	Hampshire League Division 1	3/20	Promoted
1996–97	Wessex League	18/21	
1997-98	Wessex League	20/20	Relegated
1998–99	Hampshire League Division 1	19/19	League restructure at end of season
1999-00	Hampshire League Premier Division	22/22	Relegated
2000–01	Hampshire League Division 1	16/16	
2001–02	Hampshire League Division 1	15/16	Relegated
2002–03	Hampshire League Division 2	13/13	Re-elected
2003–04	Hampshire League Division 2	2/15	Competition absorbed by Wessex League
2004–05	Wessex League Division 2	4/22	
2005–06	Wessex League Division 2	13/22	Divisions renamed at end of season
2006–07	Wessex League Division 1	3/19	Promoted
2007–08	Wessex League Premier Division	18/23	
2008-09	Wessex League Premier Division	11/22	
2009–10	Wessex League Premier Division	10/22	
2010–11	Wessex League Premier Division	16/22	
2011–12	Wessex League Premier Division	8/22	
2012–13	Wessex League Premier Division	20/21	
2013–14	Wessex League Premier Division	22/22	Relegated
2014–15	Wessex League Division 1	9/18	
2015–16	Wessex League Division 1	14/15	
2016–17	Wessex League Division 1	13/21	
2017–18	Wessex League Division 1	6/18	
2018–19	Wessex League Division 1	4/19	
2019–20	Wessex League Division 1		Season abandoned
2020–21	Wessex League Division 1		Season abandoned
2021–22	Wessex League Division 1	8/20	
2022–23	Wessex League Division 1	12/20	
2023–24	Wessex League Division 1	10/21	
2024–25	Wessex League Division 1	16/20	
2025–26	Wessex League Division 1	8/22	
2026–27	Wessex League Division 1	/21	

=== FA Cup ===
Season	Round	Opponents	Result
1948–49	EP	A v Pirelli General	W 5–2
	PRE	A v Poole Town	L 3–5
1949–50	PRE	H v Dorchester Town	L 1–4
1950–51	PRE	H v East Cowes Vics	W 3–2
	1Q	H v Dorchester Town	D 1–1
	1Qr	A v Dorchester Town	L 0–2
1983–84	PRE	H v Chippenham Town	D 1–1
	PREr	A v Chippenham Town	W 1–0
	1Q	H v Gosport Borough	L 0–2
1988–89	PRE	A v Trowbridge Town	L 0–2
1989–90	PRE	H v Westbury United	W 5–1
	1Q	H v Fareham Town	D 1–1
	1Qr	A v Fareham Town	W 2–1
	2Q	H v Poole Town	L 1–2
1990–91	PRE	H v Frome Town	W 1-0
	1Q	A v Chard Town	D 4–4
	1Qr	H v Chard Town	W 3–0
	2Q	H v Stroud	W 1–0
	3Q	A v Newport IOW	W 1–0
	4Q	H v Littlehampton Town	L 1–2
1991–92	1Q	H v Newbury Town	W 2–1
	2Q	A v Selsey	W 6–1
	3Q	A v Marlow	L 0–2
1992–93	1Q	A v Bognor Regis Town	L 2–9
2009–10	EP	H v Hayling United	W 3–0
	PRE	A v Shortwood United	L 1–5
2010–11	EP	A v Brading Town	D 1–1
	EPr	H v Brading Town	L 0–4
2011–12	EP	H v Brading Town	L 0–1
2012–13	EP	H v Lymington Town	W 4–0
	PRE	A v Horndean	L 0-2
2013–14	EP	H v Brockenhurst	L 1-4
2014–15	EP	H v Fareham Town	L 1-3
2018–19	EP	A v Andover New Street	L 0-4
2019–20	EP	H v Hamble Club	L 1-5

=== FA Amateur Cup ===
Season	Round	Opponents	Result
1948–49	E-PRE	A v HMS Collingwood	D 2-2
	E-PRE r	A v HMS Collingwood	W 3-0
	PRE	H v Bitterne Nomads	L 0-2
1952–53	PRE	A v Alton Town	L 1-5
1953–54	PRE	H v Alton Town	D 1-1
	E-PRE r	A v Alton Town	L 2-3
1954–55	Q1	A v Totton	L 1-2
1955–56	Q1	A v Ryde Sports	L 0-6

=== FA Vase ===
Season	Round	Opponents	Result
1981–82	PRE	A v Melksham Town	L 1–2
1982–83	PRE	A v Pirelli General	W 1-0
	R1	H v Burgess Hill Town	W 2-1
	R2	A v Hungerford Town	W 4-3
	R3	A v Three Bridges	L 2-3
1983–84	PRE	A v Warminster Town	D 2–2
	PRE r	H v Warminster Town	W 2–1
	R1	A v Wantage Town	L 1-3
1984–85	PRE	A v Horndean	W 2–1
	R1	A v Fairford Town	W 1–0
	R2	A v Wimborne Town	L 0-1
1985–86	PRE	A v Didcot Town	W 3–2
	R1	A v Beckton United	L 1–4
1986–87	PRE	A v Wootton Rovers	L 1-3
1987–88	PRE	A v Sherborne Town	W 5-1
	R1	H v Swanage Town & Herston	L 3-4
1988–89	PRE	A v Newbury Town	W 3-2
	R1	A v AFC Totton	D 2-2
	R1 r	H v AFC Totton	W 3-0
	R3	H v Hythe Town	W 1-0
	R3	H v Bridport	L 1-2
1989–90	PRE	A v Warminster Town	W 1-0
	R1	A v Abingdon United	W 2-0
	R2	A v Abingdon Town	L 0-2
1990–91	PRE	H v Didcot Town	L 2-4
1991–92	PRE	A v Brockenhurst	W 2-1
	R1	A v Didcot Town	L 1-2
1992–93	PRE	A v Newbury Town	L 2-6
1997–98	2Q	H v Hungerford Town	L 0-1
1998–99	2Q	H v Hungerford Town	L 1-9
1999–00	2Q	A v Croydon Athletic	L 0-4
2008–09	1Q	A v Alresford Town	L 2-3
2009–10	1Q	A v Flackwell Heath	L 0-6
2010–11	2Q	H v Horley Town	L 2-3
2011–12	2Q	H v Fawley	L 1-3
2012–13	2Q	A v Westbury United	L 1-4
2013–14	1Q	H v Bournemouth	W 6-4
	2Q	A v AFC Portchester	L 0-4
2014–15	1Q	A v Lymington Town	L 0-8
2015–16	2Q	H v Calne Town	L 0-2
2016–17	1Q	H v Warminster Town	W 3-0
	2Q	A v Christchurch	W 3-1
	R1	A v Portland United	L 2-3
2017–18	1Q	A v AFC Aldermaston	W 3-2
	2Q	H v Bournemouth	W 2-0
	R1	H v Hamble Club	L 2-3
2018–19	1Q	H v Bridport	D 4-4
	1Q r	A v Bridport	L 2-4
2019–20	2Q	H v Corsham Town	W 3-1
	R1	H v Plymouth Parkway	L 1-3
2020–21	1Q	A v Selsey	W 4-0
	2Q	H v Ringwood Town	L 1-5
2021–22	1Q	A v AFC Portchester	L 0-4
2022–23	1Q	A v Fareham Town	L 0-5
2023–24	1Q	A v Hythe & Dibden	L 1-3
2024–25	1Q	A v Fleetlands	L 1-4
2025–26	1Q	H v Totton & Eling	L 0-1
2026–27	1Q	A v Clanfield	W 3-2
	2Q	H v Bournemouth	

== Notable Players ==
- See Romsey Town players

== Print ==
- Romsey Town Football Club - The first hundred years 1886-1986 by John Moody
