= Havant Town F.C. =

Havant Town
- Full name: Havant Town Football Club
- Founded: 1883 (Reformed 1968)
- Dissolved: 1998
- Ground: West Leigh Park, Havant
- 1997–98: Southern League Division One South, 12/22
Home colours	Away colours

Havant Town F.C. was a long running semi-professional football club based in Havant, Hampshire.

They ceased to exist in 1998 when they merged with Waterlooville to form Havant & Waterlooville.

== History ==
The club were formed in 1883 as Havant Rovers and apart from a brief stint in the Hampshire League in the twenties, were members of the Portsmouth & District League for many years. In 1968 they amalgamated with Leigh Park - a hugely successful local outfit who had just won the FA Sunday Cup.

Now known as Havant & Leigh Park they won the Portsmouth League at the first attempt, and in 1971 stepped up to Division Four of the Hampshire League. Three successive promotions (including two titles) saw them quickly reach Division One. In 1976, they were renamed as Havant Town, and in order to progress further, were seeking to move away from their basic Front Lawn ground. The club purchased the site of West Leigh Park in 1980 and moved in two years later. Further ground improvements were made as they emerged as a force, reaching the quarter finals of the FA Vase in 1986.

Later that year the Wessex League was formed with Havant amongst the founder members. After twice finishing runners-up, they were finally champions in 1991, and this was rewarded with promotion to Division One South of the Southern League, where they soon became regular title contenders. They also performed well in the cup competitions, twice winning the Hampshire Senior Cup.

In 1998 neighbours and league rivals Waterlooville sold their Jubillee Park ground. Both clubs were struggling to meet rising costs - so in order to survive and progress, they then merged to create Havant & Waterlooville, continuing to play at Westleigh Park.

== Honours ==
- Hampshire Football Association
  - Senior Cup Winners 1993-94 and 1994-95. Finalists 1980-81 and 1991-92
  - Intermediate Cup Winners 1924-25 and 1947-48
  - Junior Cup Winners 1922-23
  - Russell Cotes Cup Winners 1987-88
- Portsmouth Football Association
  - Senior Cup Winners 1983-84 and 1984-85
- Wessex League
  - Champions 1990–91, Runners-up 1987-88 and 1988-89
- Hampshire League
  - Division 2 Runners-up 1973-74
  - Division 3 Champions 1972-73
  - Division 4 Champions 1971-72
- Portsmouth & District League
  - Champions 1968–69

== Playing records 1968-98 ==
=== League ===
Season	Division	Position	Significant events
1968-71	Portsmouth & District League		as Havant & Leigh Park
1971/72	Hampshire League Division 4	1/16	Promoted
1972/73	Hampshire League Division 3	1/16	Promoted
1973/74	Hampshire League Division 2	2/16	Promoted
1974/75	Hampshire League Division 1	11/16	
1975/76	Hampshire League Division 1	9/16	
1976/77	Hampshire League Division 1	12/16	as Havant Town
1977/78	Hampshire League Division 1	14/16	
1978/79	Hampshire League Division 1	16/16	Relegated
1979/80	Hampshire League Division 2	4/16	Promoted
1980/81	Hampshire League Division 1	9/20	
1981/82	Hampshire League Division 1	8/20	
1982/83	Hampshire League Division 1	3/20	
1983/84	Hampshire League Division 1	14/20	
1984/85	Hampshire League Division 1	3/20	
1985/86	Hampshire League Division 1	4/20	Left competition
1986/87	Wessex League	5/17	Founder members
1987/88	Wessex League	2/19	
1988/89	Wessex League	2/19	
1989/90	Wessex League	11/19	
1990/91	Wessex League	1/20	Promoted
1991/92	Southern League Southern Div	3/22	
1992/93	Southern League Southern Div	5/22	
1993/94	Southern League Southern Div	5/22	
1994/95	Southern League Southern Div	3/22	
1995/96	Southern League Southern Div	7/22	
1996/97	Southern League Southern Div	3/22	
1997/98	Southern League Southern Div	13/22	Merged with Waterlooville

=== FA Cup ===
Season	Round	Opponents	Result
1986/87	Preliminary Round	H v Radstock Town	D 1-1
	Replay	A v Radstock Town	W 1-0
	1st Qualifying Round	A v Brockenhurst	W 2-1
	2nd Qualifying Round	H v AFC Totton	D 1-1
	Replay	H v AFC Totton	L 0-1
1987/88	1st Qualifying Round	H v Waterlooville	L 0-2
1988/89	Preliminary Round	A v Abingdon Town	L 2-4
1989/90	Preliminary Round	A v Croydon	L 2-3
1990/91	Preliminary Round	H v Horndean	W 3-0
	1st Qualifying Round	H v Langney Sports	W 3-0
	2nd Qualifying Round	H v Kingstonian	L 0-4
1991/92	Preliminary Round	A v Oakwood	W 3-0
	1st Qualifying Round 1	H v Portfield	W 2-1
	2nd Qualifying Round	A v Marlow	L 1-2
1992/93	Preliminary Round	A v AFC Totton	W 1-0
	1st Qualifying Round	H v Horsham YMCA	W 2-1
	2nd Qualifying Round	A v Erith & Belvedere	D 1-1
	Replay	H v Erith & Belvedere	W 5-4
	2nd Qualifying Round	H Thame United	D 3-2
	Replay	A v Thame United	L 2-3
	3rd Qualifying Round	A v Sittingbourne	L 2-3
1993/94	1st Qualifying Round	A v Carshalton Athletic	L 0-2
1994/95	Preliminary Round	A v Maidenhead United	W 1-0
	1st Qualifying Round	H v Bashley	D 1-1
	Replay	A v Bashley	L 1-3
1995/96	1st Qualifying Round	A v Basingstoke Town	L 1-2
1996/97	Preliminary Round	A v Maidenhead United	W 1-0
	1st Qualifying Round	H v Bashley	L 0-3
1997/98	1st Qualifying Round	H Basingstoke Town	D 1-1
	Replay	A v Basinsgstoke Town	L 0-2

=== FA Trophy ===
Season	Round	Opponents	Result
1993/94	1st Qualifying Round	A v Newport	L 0-1
1994/95	Preliminary Round	H v Poole Town	W 2-1
	1st Qualifying Round	H v Waterlooville	W 3-0
	2nd Qualifying Round	H v Dorchester Town	L 1-3
1995/96	1st Qualifying Round	A v Hastings United	D 2-2
	Replay	H v Hastings United	W 1-0
	2nd Qualifying Round	A v Staines Town	L 1-3
1996/97	1st Qualifying Round	A v Cinderford Town	W 3-2
	2nd Qualifying Round	A v Fisher Athletic	L 2-3
1997/98	1st Qualifying Round	H v Hendon	D 2-2
	Replay	A v Hendon	L 1-2

=== FA Vase ===
Season	Round	Opponents	Result
1976/77	Round 1	A v Selsey	W 4-1
	Round 2	H v Newport	W 2-0
	Round 3	H v Gosport Borough	L 1-4
1977/78	Preliminary Round	A v Newport	L 0-3
1978/79	Preliminary Round	A v First Tower United	L 1-2
1983/84	Preliminary Round	A v Camberley Town	L 1-2
1984/85	Extra-Preliminary Round	A v Molesey	D 0-0
	Replay	H v Molesey	D 2-2
	2nd Replay	A v Molesey	W 1-0
	Preliminary Round	H v Erith & Belvedere	L 1-2
1985/86	Extra-Preliminary Round	A v Greenwich Borough	W 3-1
	Preliminary Round	H v Horley Town	W 3-0
	Round 1	H v Herne Bay	W 2-1
	Round 2	H v Merstham	W 2-1
	Round 3	H v AFC Totton	W 2-1
	Round 4	H v Sholing Sports	W 10-0
	Round 5	A v Buckingham Town	W 1-0
	Round 6	H v Wisbech Town	L 1-5
1986/87	Round 2	H v Banstead Athletic	W 3-0
	Round 3	H v Dorking	W 2-0
	Round 4	H v Selby	W 2-0
	Round 5	A v Collier Row	D 2-2
	Replay	H v Collier Row	L 4-5
1987/88	Round 2	H v Bashley	L 0-2
1988/89	Round 2	H v Flackwell Heath	W 1-0
	Round 3	H v Camberley Town	L 1-7
1989/90	Round 2	H v Hastings United	L 1-6
1990/91	Round 1	H v Bishops Cleeve	W 4-0
	Round 2	H v Merstham	W 2-0
	Round 3	H v Harefield United	L 1-3
1991/92	Round 1	H v Redhill	W 3-2
	Round 2	H v Newport	L 1-2
1992/93	Preliminary Round	A v Ashford Town (Middx)	W 3-0
	Round 1	H v Epsom & Ewell	W 1-0
	Round 2	A v First Tower United	L 2-3

== Former players ==
Havant Town was home to many notable players over the years—most notably Bobby Tambling, who played as a youngster before enjoying a long and successful professional career with a number of top clubs.

== Ground ==
Havant Town played at West Leigh Park, Martin Road, Havant, Hampshire, PO9 5TH.

The ground was opened in August 1982, and is still used by Havant & Waterlooville, who have made significant improvements to enable their progression further up the pyramid system.

In 1986 Havant Town recorded their attendance of 3,000 for the FA Vase quarter-final against Wisbech Town - although this record for the stadium has since been superseded.

== Local rivalries ==
Havant Town enjoyed a long running rivalry with a number of local clubs, most notably Horndean and neighbours Waterlooville—with whom they eventually merged.

== Successor club ==
- See Havant & Waterlooville
