= Bemerton Heath Harlequins F.C. =

Association football club in England

Coordinates: 51.0813°N 1.8348°W

Bemerton Heath Harlequins
- Full name: Bemerton Heath Harlequins Football Club
- Nicknames: Harlequins, Bemmy
- Founded: 1989
- Ground: Moon Park, Salisbury
- Capacity: 2,100 (250 seated)
- Chairman: Steve Brooks
- Manager: Jay Madden
- League: Wessex League Premier Division
- 2024–25: Southern League Division One South, 7th of 22 (resigned)
- Website: bemertonheathharlequinsfc.co.uk
Home colours	Away colours

Bemerton Heath Harlequins Football Club is a football club based in the Bemerton area of Salisbury, Wiltshire, England. Established in 1989 as a merger of Bemerton Athletic, Moon and Bemerton Boys, they are currently members of the Wessex League Premier Division and play at Moon Park.

== History ==
=== Bemerton Athletic ===
The Bemerton Club started as a boys' team in 1945 and after beating every other boys' team in the area, they changed their name to Bemerton Athletic in 1949. The club dominated the Salisbury & District Football League from the start through to the mid-1960s. In 1960–61 they were league champions with a 100% record, also winning the Wiltshire Junior Cup, Morrison Cup, South Wilts Charity 'A' and Lord Bledisloe Cup in the same season. After winning the First Division for six consecutive seasons, the club moved up to the Wiltshire Football League. They won promotion to Division One in the 1965–66 season. The club won the Wiltshire Combination League in 1972–73 and 1973–74 and the Wiltshire Senior League in 1986–87 after being runners-up for the previous three seasons.

=== Moon ===
The club was started in the late 1960s by a group of schoolboys in their mid-teens who played friendlies. They played under the name Bemerton Heath until 1973, when upon entering the Salisbury & District Sunday League, they changed their name to the Conquered Moon. They won Division Three and Division One, the Supplementary Cup and the Sunday Cup on various occasions. They also set a record of playing in seven consecutive Sunday Cup Finals. During the nine years in the Salisbury League, the club made three appearances in the Wiltshire Sunday Cup Final but never won it. The club changed its name back to Bemerton Heath, only to revert to the Conquered Moon two seasons later, to then drop the 'Conquered' in the early 1980s. In 1982 the club moved to the Andover Sunday League and within five seasons, every trophy to be played in had been won at least once. During the sixteen years (1973–1989) of competitive football that the club had played in, they never finished below second place in any league.

=== Merged club ===
The two clubs merged in May 1989 to form Bemerton Heath Harlequins, also incorporating Bemerton Boys of the Mid-Wilts League. The new club was accepted into the Wessex League for the 1989–90 season. In 1992–93 they entered the FA Cup for the first time, reaching the third qualifying round. The season also saw the club win the Wiltshire Senior Cup, beating Wollen Sports 3–1 in the final, as well as a third-place finish in the Wessex League. In 2004–05 the Wessex League was expanded to three divisions, with the original league becoming Division One. Two years later it was renamed the Premier Division.

After winning the Wessex League Cup in 2009–10, Bemerton were Premier Division runners-up in 2010–11, also winning the Senior Cup for the third time after a 2–0 win against Bradford Town. The following season saw them finish as Premier Division runners-up again, as well as winning the Hampshire FA's Russell Cotes Cup, beating Christchurch 2–0 in the final. In 2018–19 the club finished second-from-bottom of the Premier Division, resulting in relegation to Division One. In 2021–22 they were Division One champions, earning promotion back to the Premier Division. Their first season back in the Premier Division saw them finish second, resulting in promotion to Division One South of the Southern League. Despite finishing seventh in the division in 2024–25 the club resigned and dropped back into the Premier Division of the Wessex League.

== Ground ==
Bemerton Athletic played at the Salisbury and South Wiltshire Sports Club from 1945 to 1989.

The merged club play at Moon Park on Western Way. The ground has a seated stand named after former chairman Steve Slade and a covered standing area on one side of the pitch and a clubhouse with some covered seating behind one goal. It currently has a capacity of 2,100, of which 250 is seated and 350 covered.

== Managerial history ==
Start	End	Manager
1989	2007	Steve Slade
2007	2015	Ian Chalk
2015	2017	Graham Kemp
2017	2019	Rae Hughes
2019	2020	Ian Saunders
2020	2020	Jamie Cotton
December 2020	June 2024	Shaun Hale
July 2024	August 2024	James Ellis
October 2024	December 2024	Jim Milligan
January 2025	May 2025	Luke Platt
June 2025	Present	Jay Madden

== Honours ==
- Wessex League
  - Division One champions 2021–22
  - League Cup winners 2009–10
- Russell Cotes Cup
  - Winners 2011–12
- Wiltshire Senior Cup
  - Winners 1992–93, 2010–11

== Records ==
- Best FA Cup performance: Third qualifying round, 1992–93
- Best FA Vase performance: Fifth round, 1998–99, 2012–13
- Best FA Trophy performance: Second qualifying round, 2023–24
- Record attendance: 1,118 vs Aldershot Town
- Most appearances: Keith Richardson
- Most goals: Jack Slade

== See also ==
- Bemerton Heath Harlequins F.C. players
