= A.F.C. Totton =

Association football club in England

Coordinates: 50°56′1.95″N 1°30′35.7906″W

AFC Totton
- Full name: Amalgamated Football Club Totton
- Nickname: The Stags
- Founded: 1886
- Ground: Testwood Stadium, Totton
- Capacity: 3,000 (500 seated)
- Chairman: Kevin Hebenton
- Manager: Scott Rendell
- League: National League South
- 2025–26: National League South, 12th of 24
- Website: www.afctotton.com
Home colours	Away colours	Third colours

Amalgamated Football Club Totton is a football club based in Totton, Hampshire, England. The club is affiliated to the Hampshire Football Association and is an FA Standard Chartered club. They are currently members of the National League South and play at the Testwood Stadium.

== History ==
The club was formed in 1886 and originally known as Totton Football Club, playing its games at South Testwood Park. They then became a founding members of the Hampshire F.A. when it was inaugurated the following year. In 1904 they became founder members of the New Forest League. After the First World War they entered the Southampton Senior League and the New Forest League. For the 1920–21 campaign they joined the Divisional Section of the Hampshire League. In 1922–23 they played in both the East and West sections, after which they remained in the West Section, winning it in 1924–25.

League reorganisation saw Totton playing in the Divisional Section in 1928–29, with the club finishing as runners-up. Further reorganisation saw them placed in Division Two for the following season, in which they were again runners-up. They went on to win Division Two in 1930–31, earning promotion to Division One. On 30 December 1933 the club moved their home ground to Testwood Park. Despite finishing bottom of Division One in 1934–35, they were not relegated to Division Two. In 1952–53 the club was relegated to Division Two after finishing bottom of Division One, but were promoted back to the top division in 1959–60 despite only finishing fourth.

In 1975 the club amalgamated with Totton Athletic. The club were promoted to Division One when they finished as runners up in Division Two in the 1979–80 season. Totton's most successful season in terms of the number of trophies won was the 1981–82 campaign when they won Hampshire League Division One for the first time, the Russell Cotes Cup, Hampshire Intermediate Cup, Southampton Senior Cup, Echo Trophy, and the Reg Mathieson Trophy. The following season saw the club make their debut in the FA Cup, getting to the fourth qualification round at their first attempt before being knocked out by Windsor & Eton. The club went on to win the Hampshire league again in the 1984–85 season, and followed this up the following season with their fourth runner up spot.

Totton became one of the founder members of the Wessex League for the 1986–87 season. Although the league title eluded the club for many years, they still performed well in cup competitions. The next twenty seasons saw the club maintain their status in the Wessex league top division, during which time they won the Wessex League Cup twice in the 1989–90, 2002–03 and 2005–06 seasons. The club also finished as runners-up to Southern League Bashley in the Russell Côtes Cup in 1990–91.

The 2006–07 campaign saw the club finish runners up just behind Gosport Borough on goal difference. The main highlight of the season though, was their run in the F.A. Vase, which saw the club reach the final at Wembley Stadium for the first time in the club's history. In front of a record crowd of 27,754 for a Vase final, the team had to settle for runners-up after losing to Truro City 3–1.

The following season saw the club seal its first ever Wessex League Championship. The championship win also enabled promotion to the Southern League. The club started in Division One South & West of the Southern league, and were almost promoted at their first attempt, when they beat Beaconsfield SYCOB 2–1 in the playoff semi-final, but lost to Didcot Town 2–1 in the play-off final in front of a crowd of 1,123. Again in the following season the club, after finishing as runners-up, were in the play-offs this time losing to Cirencester Town in the semi-final. The club did finish with some silverware when they won the Hampshire Senior Cup for the first time, beating Aldershot Town 4–0 in the final at Dean Court.

The 2010–11 season saw the Stags play their first match at the newly built 3,000-capacity Testwood Stadium with the first match against Paulton Rovers, winning 5–1. The club also gained promotion to the Premier Division when they won the league on the final day of the season with a 1–0 win away at Gosport Borough. The club made it a double winning season when they beat Sholing 3–1 in the Hampshire Senior Cup final at the home of Southampton, St. Mary's Stadium.

The 2011–12 season saw the club beat Bradford Park Avenue 8–1 to reach the FA Cup second round for the first time in their history. A record attendance of 2,315 was achieved beating their previous record of 1,746 when Totton played Southampton in 2009. Totton's dream of reaching the third round of the FA Cup was ended as they lost 6–1 against Bristol Rovers in the FA Cup 2nd Round at the Testwood Stadium. The club also finished third in the league, and so entered the play-offs to gain promotion to the Football Conference beating Chesham United 3–2 in the semi-final, but lost 4–2 to Oxford City in the final The club finished the season in the Hampshire Senior Cup final at St Mary's Stadium, but could not make it three wins in a row as they lost to Eastleigh 2–0.

After finishing mid-table in 2012–13 Totton were relegated to Division One South & West at the end of the 2013–14 season. In 2021–22 the club won the Southampton Senior Cup, defeating Folland Sports 3–0 in the final. The following season they won the Division One South title, earning promotion to the Premier South Division. The club also beat their Division One Central counterparts Berkhamsted 2–1 in the Southern League Division One Champion of Champions match, as well as retaining the Southampton Senior Cup with a 3–0 victory over Sholing in the final.

In 2023–24 Totton were runners-up in the Premier Division South. In the subsequent play-offs they defeated Bracknell Town 2–1 in the play-off semi-finals, before being beaten on penalties by Salisbury in the final. They were runners-up in the Premier Division South the following season, before going on to beat Dorchester Town 4–3 after extra time in the semi-finals and then Gloucester City 1–0 in the final to earn promotion to the National League South.

== Ground ==
The club initially played at South Testwood Park, before moving to Testwood Park in December 1933. After the 1975 merger with Totton Athletic floodlights were installed. The ground had stands on either side of the pitch, one of which was seated and the other for standing.

In February 2011 the club moved to the Testwood Stadium on Salisbury Road, playing their first match on 9 February with 744 watching them beat Paulton Rovers 5–1. The ground cost a reported £2.5 million to build, and has a capacity of 3,000, of which 500 are seated and covered. The ground is also used by Southampton F.C. Women and the Southampton B team.

== Current squad ==
As of 18 August 2026

Note: Flags indicate national team as defined under FIFA eligibility rules; some limited exceptions apply. Players may hold more than one non-FIFA nationality.

No.	Pos.	Nation	Player
2	DF	ENG	Charlie Betts
3	DF	ENG	Reuben Austin
4	MF	ENG	Mike Carter
5	DF	ENG	Luke Hallett
6	DF	CAN	Matt Chandler
7	FW	ENG	Josh Sims
8	MF	ENG	Reece Fleet
10	FW	ENG	Tony Lee
11	FW	ENG	Sol Wanjau-Smith
13	GK	ENG	Ryan Gosney

No.	Pos.	Nation	Player
14	FW	NGR	Ibrahim Olateju
17	DF	ENG	Declan Rose
19	MF	ENG	Christie Ward
22	MF	ENG	Luke Bennett
23	FW	ENG	Ralph Vigrass
24	FW	USA	Vaughn Covil
25	MF	ENG	Dylan Andrews
26	DF	ENG	Tyler Cordner
27	MF	ENG	Craig Tanner
—	FW	ENG	Scott Rendell (player-manager)

== Honours ==
- Southern League
  - Division One South champions 2022–23
  - Division One South & West champions 2010–11
  - Division One Champion of Champions 2022–23
- Wessex League
  - Premier Division champions 2007–08
  - League Cup winners 1989–90, 2002–03, 2005–06
- Hampshire League
  - Division One champions 1981–82, 1984–85
  - Division Two champions 1930–31, 1966–67
- Hampshire League West
  - Champions 1924–25
- New Forest League
  - Champions 1905–06, 1910–11, 1913–14, 1919–20, 1925–26, 1926–27, 1947–48, 1960–61, 1961–62
- Hampshire Senior Cup
  - Winners 2009–10, 2010–11
- Russell-Cotes Cup
  - Winners 1938–39, 1981–82, 1998–99
- Southampton FA Senior Cup
  - Winners 1928–29, 1929–30, 1946–47, 1980–81, 1981–82, 2021–22, 2022–23
- Echo Trophy
  - Winners 1981–82
- Reg Mathieson Trophy
  - Winners 1981–82
- Hampshire Intermediate Cup
  - Winners 1946–47, 1966–67, 1981–82, 1982–83
- Hampshire Junior Cup
  - Winners 1913–14
- New Forest League Challenge Cup
  - Winners 1905–06
- Perkins Charity Cup
  - Winners 1909–10, 1912–13, 1913–14, 1926–27, 1957–58, 1960–61

== Records ==
- Best FA Cup performance: Second round, 2011–12
- Best FA Trophy performance: Third round, 2021–22, 2024–25, 2025–26
- Best FA Vase best performance: Runners-up, 2006–07
- Record attendance: 2,315 vs Bradford Park Avenue, FA Cup first round, 12 November 2011
- Most appearances: Michael Gosney, 427 (as of 13 March 2017)

== See also ==
- A.F.C. Totton players
- A.F.C. Totton managers
