= Folland Sports F.C. =

Association football club in England

Coordinates: 50°51′49″N 1°19′47″W

Folland Sports
- Full name: Folland Sports Football Club
- Nickname: The Planemakers
- Founded: 1938 (as Folland Aircraft)
- Ground: Folland Park, Hamble-le-Rice
- Capacity: 1,000 (150 seated)
- Chairmen: Ian Josephs & James Langdown
- Manager: Jayda Chiutare
- League: Wessex League Division One
- 2025–26: Wessex League Division One, 2nd of 22
Home colours	Away colours

Folland Sports Football Club is a football club based in Hamble-le-Rice, near Southampton, in Hampshire, England. They are currently members of the Wessex League Division One and play at Folland Park.

== History ==
The club was established in 1938 by workers of the Hamble-le-Rice aircraft factory under the name Folland Aircraft. The club won the Hampshire Senior Cup in 1940–41. The following season saw the club win the Hampshire League and the Hampshire FA's Russell Cotes Cup. By 1948 the club had left the Hampshire League and were renamed Folland Sports. After a spell playing in the Southampton League, they rejoined the Hampshire League in 1968, becoming members of Division Three East.

When league reorganisation in 1971 saw the regional third divisions replaced with Division Three and Division Four, Folland Sports were placed in Division Three. However, in 1975–76 they finished second-from-bottom of Division Three and were relegated to Division Four. In 1979–80 the club were Division Four champions and moved up to Division Three as Division Four was disbanded; the season also saw them win the Hampshire Intermediate Cup. They won Division Three the following season, earning a second successive promotion, this time to Division Two. In 1985–86 the club were Division Two runners-up and were promoted to Division One. After finishing third in Division One the following season, they moved up to the Wessex League.

In 1990 the club were renamed Aerostructures S&S. In 1997–98 they won the League Cup, before adopting another new name, this time becoming Hamble ASSC. When the Wessex League gained a second division in 2004 the club became members of Division One. The division was renamed the Premier Division in 2006, and despite finishing bottom of the table in 2006–07 they avoided relegation to Division One. However, after finishing second-from-bottom of the division in 2008–09, the club were relegated to Division One. They went on to win Division One the following season, earning an immediate promotion back to the Premier Division. In 2011 the club were renamed GE Hamble, although the new name lasted only two seasons as they reverted back to their former name of Folland Sports in 2013.

Folland Sports finished bottom of the Wessex League Premier Division in 2015–16 and were relegated to Division One. They finished fourth in Division One in 2021–22, qualifying for the promotion play-offs; the club subsequently lost their semi-final against Newport (IOW) on penalties. They were Division One runners-up in 2025–26, before losing 1–0 to Whitchurch United in the play-off semi-finals.

== Ground ==
The club play at Folland Park. When they joined the Wessex League in 1987 the ground was upgraded, with floodlights and pitch barriers installed. The ground has a small stand with wooden bench seating on one side of the pitch, with uncovered standing at both ends. It has a capacity of 1,000, of which 150 is seated and covered.

== Honours ==
- Wessex League
  - Division One champions 2009–10
  - League Cup winners 1997–98
- Hampshire League
  - Division Three champions 1980–81
  - Division Four champions 1979–80
- Hampshire Senior Cup
  - Winners 1940–41
- Southampton Senior Cup
  - Winners 1944–45, 1984–85, 1986–87
- Reg Mathieson Cup
  - Winners 1984–85, 1986–87
- Hampshire Intermediate Cup
  - Winners 1979–80

== Records ==
- Best FA Cup performance: Third qualifying round, 2010–11
- Best FA Vase performance: Third round, 2012–13

== See also ==
- Folland Sports F.C. players
