= 2026–27 Wessex Football League =

Wessex Football League
- Season: 2026–27

The 2026–27 Wessex Football League season will be the 41st in the history of the Wessex Football League since its establishment in 1986. The league consists of two divisions: the Premier Division and Division One.

The constitution was announced on 14 May 2026.

== Premier Division ==
The Premier Division is increased from 20 clubs to 21 after A.F.C. Stoneham and Portland United were promoted, New Milton Town were relegated, and Wincanton Town requested voluntary demotion to the Western League First Division.

Five new teams joined the division:

- One promoted from Division One:
  - Fleetlands
- One promoted from the Western League First Division:
  - Sturminster Newton United
- Two relegated from Isthmian League South Central Division:
  - Fareham Town
  - Horndean
- One relegated from Southern League Division One South:
  - Bashley

=== League table ===
Pos	Team	Pld	W	D	L	GF	GA	GD	Pts	Promotion, qualification or relegation
1	Fareham Town	17	13	2	2	38	12	+26	41	Promotion to step 4
2	Hamble Club	22	11	7	4	61	35	+26	40	Qualification for the play-offs
3	Hamworthy Recreation	17	11	5	1	44	14	+30	38	Qualification for the play-offs
4	Laverstock & Ford	21	11	5	5	50	34	+16	38	Qualification for the play-offs
5	Downton	21	11	3	7	45	35	+10	36	Qualification for the play-offs
6	Millbrook	18	10	5	3	40	24	+16	35	
7	Horndean	20	11	2	7	40	30	+10	35	
8	Bashley	18	11	1	6	42	23	+19	34	
9	Brockenhurst	17	9	2	6	40	31	+9	29	
10	Baffins Milton Rovers	19	8	5	6	32	34	−2	29	
11	Fleetlands	18	6	6	6	29	33	−4	24	
12	Andover New Street	16	5	8	3	30	22	+8	23	
13	Sturminster Newton United	18	6	5	7	30	28	+2	23	
14	Cowes Sports	16	6	4	6	25	32	−7	22	
15	Hythe & Dibden	21	5	4	12	28	36	−8	19	
16	East Cowes Victoria Athletic	17	4	5	8	25	37	−12	17	
17	Sherborne Town	19	2	8	9	16	33	−17	14	
18	Petersfield Town	20	2	8	10	25	47	−22	14	
19	Bemerton Heath Harlequins	21	2	6	13	25	65	−40	12	
20	Christchurch	18	3	2	13	29	58	−29	11	Relegation to Division One
21	Bournemouth	20	1	5	14	16	47	−31	8	Relegation to Division One

Updated to match(es) played on 22:51, 21 November 2026 (UTC). Source: Wessex League
Rules for classification: 1) points; 2) goal difference; 3) number of goals scored.

=== Results table ===
Home \ Away	ANS	BMR	BAS	BHH	BOU	BRK	CHR	COW	DOW	ECV	FAR	FLE	HMB	HWR	HOR	H&D	L&F	MIL	PET	SHE	STU
Andover New Street	—		2–0	1–1	6–0									1–5		2–3					
Baffins Milton Rovers		—								1–0		1–1					2–3	0–3			3–1
Bashley		2–1	—	4–2		4–2	4–1					5–0	0–1		1–2				5–1		
Bemerton Heath Harlequins				—	1–1		3–2					2–3		2–4	1–4		1–5	0–1	2–2	1–1	
Bournemouth		2–3		1–2	—		1–0				0–2				1–3	0–2	2–2			0–2	
Brockenhurst				5–0		—	1–0			2–2			3–4	1–4	3–2						2–1
Christchurch		4–4					—						0–4							1–1	
Cowes Sports	1–1	0–0				0–2	5–1	—					1–1			3–1					
Downton		3–2	2–1	8–1		0–2	4–3	7–2	—		2–3				3–0			2–1	1–1		
East Cowes Victoria Athletic	0–1				3–0				2–2	—			2–2		0–3	1–1					
Fareham Town			1–0	5–1		3–1		2–0			—					2–1				5–0	
Fleetlands		2–0			2–1			5–1			2–1	—	2–2			1–3	2–1	2–2	2–2		
Hamble Club	2–2	1–2		7–0	2–2					2–1	1–1		—	1–4		4–2			4–0	2–1	
Hamworthy Recreation				1–1			6–0	1–3	1–0					—					3–1		
Horndean	2–2							0–1	2–1		0–1	3–2	5–3		—			1–2		1–2	
Hythe & Dibden		1–2	1–2	1–1					3–1						0–1	—				0–0	
Laverstock & Ford	2–2						5–3		1–2	3–3			2–2			4–3	—				2–0
Millbrook	1–0		3–3		3–1		2–1							1–2		3–0	0–2	—	3–3		2–2
Petersfield Town		2–2				0–2				2–3	1–2				1–2	1–1	2–1		—		2–2
Sherborne Town	1–1				1–1	2–5			1–2			0–0		1–1			0–1		1–3	—	
Sturminster Newton United	1–1				3–1		5–1		3–1	5–0	0–1		2–1	2–2		1–0					—

Updated to match(es) played on 27 October 2026. Source: FA Full-Time Grid
Legend: Blue = home team win; Yellow = draw; Red = away team win.
For upcoming matches, an "a" indicates there is an article about the rivalry between the two participants.

=== Stadia and locations ===
Location of the clubs in the 2026–27 Wessex Football League Premier Division (Dorset)
Location of the clubs in the 2026–27 Wessex Football League Premier Division (Hampshire)

Club	Location	Stadium	Capacity
Andover New Street	Charlton	Foxcotte Park	1,000
Baffins Milton Rovers	Portsmouth	PMC Stadium	800
Bashley	New Milton	Bashley Community Stadium	4,250
Bemerton Heath Harlequins	Bemerton	Moon Park	2,100
Bournemouth	Bournemouth	Victoria Park	3,000
Brockenhurst	Brockenhurst	Grigg Lane	2,000
Christchurch	Hurn	Hurn Bridge Sports Club	2,000
Cowes Sports	Cowes	Westwood Park	2,000
Downton	Downton	Brian Whitehead Sports Ground	2,000
East Cowes Victoria Athletic	East Cowes	Beatrice Avenue	1,000
Fareham Town	Fareham	Cams Alders Stadium	5,500
Fleetlands	Gosport	Powder Monkey Park	1,000
Hamble Club	Hamble-le-Rice	Hamble Community Facility	1,000
Hamworthy Recreation	Wimborne	Magna Road	1,500
Horndean	Horndean	Kingsmere Group Stadium	500
Hythe & Dibden	Dibden	Clayfields Sport Centre	1,000
Laverstock & Ford	Laverstock	Church Road	1,000
Millbrook	Southampton	Test Park	1,000
Petersfield Town	Petersfield	The Southdown Builders Stadium	3,000
Sherborne Town	Sherborne	Raleigh Grove	1,150
Sturminster Newton United	Sturminster Newton	The We Heat South Stadium	1,000

== Division One ==
Division One is reduced from 22 clubs to 21 after Fleetlands and Yateley United were promoted, Clanfield were transferred to the Southern Combination, and Blackfield & Langley and United Services Portsmouth were relegated. Amesbury Town were initially due to be transferred to the Western League, however following an appeal they were reinstated to the Wessex League.

Four new teams joined the division:

- One relegated from the Premier Division:
  - New Milton Town
- One transferred from Combined Counties Football League Division One:
  - Sandhurst Town
- One promoted from the Hampshire Premier League:
  - Hedge End Rangers
- One promoted from the Dorset Premier League:
  - Blandford United

=== League table ===
Pos	Team	Pld	W	D	L	GF	GA	GD	Pts	Promotion, qualification or relegation
1	Cove	15	12	1	2	40	16	+24	37	Promotion to the Premier Division
2	New Milton Town	15	11	3	1	36	16	+20	36	Qualification for the play-offs
3	Sandhurst Town	17	11	2	4	42	20	+22	35	Qualification for the play-offs
4	Ringwood Town	19	10	4	5	42	37	+5	34	Qualification for the play-offs
5	Amesbury Town	20	10	2	8	35	41	−6	32	Qualification for the play-offs
6	Newport (IOW)	16	8	6	2	47	22	+25	30	
7	Hedge End Rangers	17	8	4	5	37	26	+11	28	
8	Fawley	16	8	4	4	33	24	+9	28	
9	Frimley Green	18	8	2	8	45	33	+12	26	
10	Ash United	16	7	5	4	30	24	+6	26	
11	Folland Sports	18	8	2	8	37	41	−4	26	
12	Alresford Town	21	7	3	11	37	45	−8	24	
13	Romsey Town	16	7	1	8	35	31	+4	22	
14	A.F.C. Aldermaston	18	6	4	8	28	33	−5	22	
15	Lymington Town	21	6	5	10	24	44	−20	22 (Note: Lymington Town had one point deducted.)	
16	Blandford United	15	6	2	7	29	28	+1	20	
17	Colden Common	18	5	4	9	38	40	−2	19	
18	Whitchurch United	19	4	5	10	33	52	−19	17	
19	Hamworthy United	19	4	4	11	28	38	−10	16	Possible relegation to a county feeder league
20	Kintbury Rangers	18	3	4	11	23	44	−21	13	Possible relegation to a county feeder league
21	Totton & Eling	18	2	1	15	19	63	−44	7	Possible relegation to a county feeder league

Updated to match(es) played on 22:57, 21 November 2026 (UTC). Source: Wessex Leagues
Rules for classification: 1) points; 2) goal difference; 3) number of goals scored.

=== Results table ===
Home \ Away	ALD	ALR	AME	ASH	BLA	COL	COV	FAW	FOL	FRI	HWU	HED	KIN	LYM	NMT	NEW	RIN	ROM	SAN	T&E	WHI
A.F.C. Aldermaston	—																				
Alresford Town		—																			
Amesbury Town			—																		
Ash United				—																	
Blandford United					—																
Colden Common						—															
Cove							—														
Fawley								—													
Folland Sports									—												
Frimley Green										—											
Hamworthy United											—										
Hedge End Rangers												—									
Kintbury Rangers													—								
Lymington Town														—							
New Milton Town															—						
Newport (IOW)																—					
Ringwood Town																	—				
Romsey Town																		—			
Sandhurst Town																			—		
Totton & Eling																				—	
Whitchurch United																					—

Updated to match(es) played on unknown. Source: FA Full-Time Grid
Legend: Blue = home team win; Yellow = draw; Red = away team win.
For upcoming matches, an "a" indicates there is an article about the rivalry between the two participants.

=== Stadia and locations ===
Location of the clubs in the 2025–26 Wessex Football League Division One

Club	Location	Stadium	Capacity
A.F.C. Aldermaston	Aldermaston	Waterside Park (Note: Groundshare with Thatcham Town)	1,500
Alresford Town	New Alresford	Arlebury Park	1,000
Amesbury Town	Amesbury	Bonnymead Park	1,000
Ash United	Ash	Shawfield Road	2,500
Blandford United	Blandford Forum	Park Road Recreation Ground	750
Colden Common	Otterbourne	Charters Community Stadium (Note: Groundshare with Winchester City)	4,500
Cove	Farnborough	Squirrel Lane	
Fawley	Holbury	Waterside Sports & Social Club	1,000
Folland Sports	Hamble-le-Rice	Folland Park	1,000
Frimley Green	Frimley Green	Frimley Green Recreation Ground	2,000
Hamworthy United	Poole	County Ground	1,000
Hedge End Rangers	Southampton	Mortgage Decisions Stadium (Note: Groundshare with Sholing)	1,000
Kintbury Rangers	Kintbury	The Recreation Ground	
Lymington Town	Lymington	The Sports Ground	1,000
New Milton Town	New Milton	GD Print Stadium	3,000
Newport (IOW)	Newport	WightFibre Park	3,000
Ringwood Town	Ringwood	Long Lane	1,000
Romsey Town	Romsey	Southampton Road	2,000
Sandhurst Town	Sandhurst	Bottom Meadow	1,108
Totton & Eling	Southampton	Little Testwood Farm	1,500
Whitchurch United	Whitchurch	Longmeadow	1,000
