= 2022–23 Wessex Football League =

Wessex Football League
- Season: 2022–23

The 2022–23 Wessex Football League season was the 37th in the history of the Wessex Football League since its establishment in 1986. The league consists of two divisions: the Premier Division and Division One.

The constitution was announced on 12 May 2022.

== Premier Division ==
The Premier Division was reduced from 21 clubs to 20, after Bashley and Hamworthy United were promoted to the Southern League South Division; Alton were transferred to the Combined Counties League, and Amesbury Town were relegated to Division One.

Three new teams joined the division:

- Two promoted from Division One:
  - Bemerton Heath Harlequins
  - Laverstock & Ford
- One transferred from Southern Combination League Premier Division:
  - Pagham
- The club finishing the season in second position was initially required to play in an inter-step playoff with a team from step 4. Due to ground grading failures higher up the pyramid, three step 4 clubs were reprieved, and the three step 5 runners-up with the highest PPG (points per game) were automatically promoted. Bemerton Heath Harlequins were one of those three.

=== League table ===
Pos	Team	Pld	W	D	L	GF	GA	GD	Pts	Promotion, qualification or relegation
1	Horndean (C, P)	38	32	2	4	126	21	+105	98	Promoted to the Isthmian League
2	Bemerton Heath Harlequins (P)	38	30	5	3	123	33	+90	95	Promoted to the Southern League
3	AFC Stoneham	38	31	2	5	111	37	+74	95	
4	AFC Portchester	38	30	4	4	115	49	+66	94	
5	Moneyfields	38	19	8	11	76	47	+29	65	
6	Hamble Club	38	20	5	13	88	65	+23	65	
7	Baffins Milton Rovers	38	19	6	13	68	52	+16	63	
8	Laverstock & Ford	38	17	4	17	66	67	−1	55	
9	Fareham Town	38	14	7	17	64	71	−7	49	
10	Christchurch	38	15	3	20	62	77	−15	48	
11	Portland United	38	13	8	17	64	76	−12	47	
12	Hythe & Dibden	38	13	8	17	63	76	−13	47	
13	Shaftesbury	38	14	4	20	73	80	−7	46	
14	Brockenhurst	38	11	5	22	54	91	−37	38	
15	Blackfield & Langley	38	11	5	22	53	90	−37	38	
16	Cowes Sports	38	10	7	21	42	83	−41	37	
17	Bournemouth	38	11	4	23	48	97	−49	37	
18	United Services Portsmouth	38	10	5	23	61	90	−29	35	
19	Pagham	38	10	4	24	51	93	−42	34	Reprieved and transferred to the Southern Combination
20	Alresford Town (R)	38	1	2	35	25	138	−113	5	Relegated to Division One

Source: Wessex League
Rules for classification: 1) points; 2) goal difference; 3) number of goals scored.
(C) Champions; (P) Promoted; (R) Relegated

=== Stadia and locations ===
Location of the clubs in the 2022–23 Wessex Football League Premier Division (Dorset)
Location of the clubs in the 2022–23 Wessex Football League Premier Division (Hampshire)

Club	Location	Stadium	Capacity
A.F.C. Portchester	Fareham	Wicor Recreation Ground	
A.F.C. Stoneham	Eastleigh	Stoneham Lane Football Complex	1,000
Alresford Town	New Alresford	Arlebury Park	1,000
Baffins Milton Rovers	Portsmouth	PMC Stadium	
Bemerton Heath Harlequins	Bemerton	Moon Park	2,100
Blackfield & Langley	Fawley	Gang Warily Recreation Centre	2,500
Bournemouth	Bournemouth	Victoria Park	3,000
Brockenhurst	Brockenhurst	Grigg Lane	2,000
Christchurch	Hurn	Hurn Bridge Sports Club	2,000
Cowes Sports	Cowes	Westwood Park	2,000
Fareham Town	Fareham	Cams Alder Stadium	5,500
Hamble Club	Hamble-le-Rice	Hamble Community Facility	
Horndean	Horndean	Five Heads Park	2,000
Hythe & Dibden	Dibden	Clayfields Sport Centre	1,000
Laverstock & Ford	Laverstock	Church Road	
Moneyfields	Portsmouth	John Jenkins Stadium	1,180
Pagham	Pagham	Nyetimber Lane	1,500
Portland United	Portland	Camp and Satherley Stadium	2,000
Shaftesbury	Shaftesbury	Cockrams	1,000
United Services Portsmouth	Portsmouth	Victory Stadium	1,000

== Division One ==
Division One remained at 20 clubs after Bemerton Heath Harlequins and Laverstock & Ford were promoted to the Premier Division, and Infinity resigned from the league during last season.

Three new teams joined the division:

- One relegated from the Premier Division:
  - Amesbury Town
- One promoted from the Hampshire Premier League:
  - Fleetlands
- One promoted from the Dorset Premier League:
  - Hamworthy Recreation

=== League table ===
Pos	Team	Pld	W	D	L	GF	GA	GD	Pts	Promotion, qualification or relegation
1	Andover New Street (C, P)	38	29	6	3	104	39	+65	93	Promoted to the Premier Division
2	Newport (IOW)	38	27	5	6	97	38	+59	86	Qualification for the play-offs
3	New Milton Town	38	27	3	8	116	50	+66	84	Qualification for the play-offs
4	Hamworthy Recreation	38	27	3	8	101	46	+55	84	Qualification for the play-offs
5	Petersfield Town (O, P)	38	23	7	8	86	36	+50	76	Qualification for the play-offs
6	Downton	38	22	6	10	103	49	+54	72	
7	Andover Town	38	18	5	15	90	74	+16	59	
8	Fleetlands	38	18	5	15	58	62	−4	59	
9	Totton & Eling	38	15	10	13	56	57	−1	55	
10	Millbrook	38	16	6	16	90	99	−9	54	
11	Folland Sports	38	15	8	15	68	65	+3	53	
12	Romsey Town	38	13	8	17	67	77	−10	47	
13	Fawley	38	13	6	19	62	71	−9	45	
14	Verwood Town	38	13	5	20	68	75	−7	44	
15	East Cowes Victoria Athletic	38	9	12	17	38	74	−36	39	
16	Whitchurch United	38	11	3	24	61	85	−24	36	
17	Ringwood Town	38	9	4	25	60	97	−37	31	
18	Ash United	38	6	10	22	56	106	−50	28	Reprieved from relegation
19	Amesbury Town (R)	38	6	8	24	42	117	−75	26	Relegated to the Wiltshire League
20	Fleet Spurs (R)	38	3	0	35	26	132	−106	9	Relegated to the Hampshire Premier League

Source: Wessex Leagues
Rules for classification: 1) points; 2) goal difference; 3) number of goals scored.
(C) Champions; (O) Play-off winners; (P) Promoted; (R) Relegated

=== Promotion playoffs ===
Semi-finals
2	Newport (IOW)	0 (8)
5	Petersfield Town (pens)	0 (9)
3	New Milton Town (pens)	0 (3)
4	Hamworthy Recreation	0 (1)

Final
3	New Milton Town	1 (1)
5	Petersfield Town (pens)	1 (4)

==== Semifinals ====
25 April 2023	Newport (IOW)	0–0 (a.e.t.) (8–9 p)	Petersfield Town	Cowes
				Stadium: Westwood Park; Attendance: 279

26 April 2023	New Milton Town	0–0 (a.e.t.) (3–1 p)	Hamworthy Recreation	New Milton
				Stadium: Fawcetts Field; Attendance: 251

==== Final ====
29 April 2023	New Milton Town	1–1 (a.e.t.) (1–4 p)	Petersfield Town	New Milton
				Stadium: Fawcetts Field; Attendance: 544

=== Stadia and locations ===
Location of the clubs in the 2022–23 Wessex Football League Division One

Club	Location	Stadium	Capacity
Amesbury Town	Amesbury	Bonnymead Park	1,000
Andover New Street	Charlton	Foxcotte Park	1,000
Andover Town	Andover	Portway Stadium	3,000
Ash United	Ash	Shawfield Road	2,500
Downton	Downton	Brian Whitehead Sports Ground	2,000
East Cowes Victoria	East Cowes	Beatrice Avenue	1,000
Fawley	Holbury	Waterside Sports & Social Club	1,000
Fleet Spurs	Fleet	Kennels Lane	1,000
Fleetlands	Gosport	DARA Fleetlands	1,000
Folland Sports	Hamble-le-Rice	Folland Park	1,000
Hamworthy Recreation	Wimborne	Magna Road	1,500
Millbrook	Southampton	Test Park	1,000
New Milton Town	New Milton	Fawcetts Field	3,000
Newport (IOW)	Newport	Beatrice Avenue (groundshare with East Cowes Victoria)	1,000
Petersfield Town	Petersfield	The Southdown Builders Stadium	3,000
Ringwood Town	Ringwood	Long Lane	1,000
Romsey Town	Romsey	Southampton Road	
Totton & Eling	Southampton	Little Testwood Farm	1,500
Verwood Town	Verwood	Potterne Park	1,000
Whitchurch United	Whitchurch	Longmeadow	1,000
