= 2024–25 Wessex Football League =

Wessex Football League
- Season: 2024–25

The 2024–25 Wessex Football League season was the 39th in the history of the Wessex Football League since its establishment in 1986. The league consisted of two divisions: the Premier Division and Division One.

The constitution was announced on 17 May 2024. The Premier Division (step 5) promotes two clubs; one as champions and one via a four-team play-off.

== Premier Division ==
The Premier Division remained at 20 clubs, after Moneyfields and Shaftesbury were promoted to the Southern League South Division; Petersfield Town were transferred to the Southern Combination League, and Lymington Town were relegated to Division One.

Four new teams joined the division:

- Three promoted from Division One:
  - Downton
  - Hamworthy Recreation
  - Millbrook
- One promoted and transferred from the Western League First Division:
  - Wincanton Town

=== League table ===
Pos	Team	Pld	W	D	L	GF	GA	GD	Pts	Promotion, qualification or relegation
1	A.F.C. Portchester (C, P)	38	33	4	1	120	25	+95	103	Promoted to the Isthmian League SC Division
2	A.F.C. Stoneham	38	27	10	1	114	23	+91	91	Qualified for the play-offs
3	Fareham Town (O, P)	38	23	3	12	83	48	+35	72	Promoted to the Isthmian League SC Division
4	Hamble Club	38	23	6	9	81	56	+25	72 (Note: Hamble Club had three points deducted)	Qualified for the play-offs
5	Andover New Street	38	22	6	10	73	53	+20	72	Qualified for the play-offs
6	Baffins Milton Rovers	38	21	7	10	73	53	+20	70	
7	Hamworthy Recreation	38	21	4	13	81	61	+20	67	
8	Millbrook	38	18	7	13	74	62	+12	61	
9	Sherborne Town	38	16	8	14	59	54	+5	56	
10	Christchurch	38	14	6	18	73	71	+2	48	
11	Bournemouth	38	12	9	17	59	71	−12	45	
12	Cowes Sports	38	12	9	17	59	73	−14	45	
13	Laverstock & Ford	38	13	6	19	67	84	−17	45	
14	Hythe & Dibden	38	12	7	19	57	84	−27	43	
15	Wincanton Town	38	11	7	20	64	100	−36	40	
16	Brockenhurst	38	12	3	23	50	84	−34	39	
17	Portland United	38	10	7	21	54	76	−22	37	
18	Downton	38	9	6	23	44	93	−49	33	
19	Blackfield & Langley (R)	38	7	3	28	38	85	−47	24	Relegated to Division One
20	United Services Portsmouth (R)	38	2	6	30	29	96	−67	12	Relegated to Division One

Source: Wessex League
Rules for classification: 1) points; 2) goal difference; 3) number of goals scored.
(C) Champions; (O) Play-off winners; (P) Promoted; (R) Relegated

=== Promotion playoffs ===
Semi-finals
2	A.F.C. Stoneham	1 (3)
5	Andover New Street	1 (4)
3	Fareham Town	2
4	Hamble Club	0

Final
3	Fareham Town	2
5	Andover New Street	1

==== Semifinals ====
22 April	A.F.C. Stoneham	1–1 (3–4 p)	Andover New Street	Eastleigh
19:45	Jenkins 37'	Report	Carswell 67'	Stadium: Stoneham Football Complex; Attendance: 505
	Penalties
	Pope (penalty scored); Thomson (penalty scored); Sampson (penalty scored)		(penalty scored) Lock; (penalty scored) Herbert; (penalty scored) Williams; (penalty scored) Thatcher

23 April	Fareham Town	2–0	Hamble Club	Fareham
19:45	Neil 23'; Bridgman 90+3'	Report		Stadium: Cams Alders Stadium; Attendance: 698

==== Final ====
26 April	Fareham Town	2–1	Andover New Street	Fareham
15:00	Neil 6'; Bridgman 54' (pen.)	Report	Williams 73'	Stadium: Cams Alders Stadium; Attendance: 1,103

=== Results table ===
Home \ Away	PCH	STO	ANS	BMR	B&L	BOU	BRK	CHR	CWS	DOW	FAR	HBC	HWR	H&D	L&F	MIL	PLD	SHE	USP	WIN
A.F.C. Portchester	—	0–0	2–4	2–2	5–0	4–1	2–1	2–0	7–1	1–0	3–1	2–0	3–2	5–1	6–1	2–0	2–0	1–0	3–0	7–1
A.F.C. Stoneham	0–0	—	4–1	4–0	3–1	0–0	4–2	5–0	2–3	10–0	3–0	1–1	4–0	4–0	3–0	5–3	4–2	2–0	7–2	4–0
Andover New Street	1–7	2–2	—	0–2	3–1	1–0	1–1	2–0	0–2	5–0	2–3	5–1	1–2	1–0	0–0	2–3	3–0	1–1	2–1	8–1
Baffins Milton Rovers	2–2	1–3	4–2	—	0–1	4–0	3–0	4–1	3–2	2–1	2–1	0–1	1–1	1–0	2–1	2–1	1–1	2–5	2–0	2–0
Blackfield & Langley	0–4	0–0	0–2	0–1	—	1–3	1–2	1–5	1–0	5–1	1–4	1–2	0–3	0–1	1–4	1–0	1–3	1–3	1–0	2–3
Bournemouth	0–2	0–1	0–1	3–3	1–1	—	2–1	0–3	1–0	1–2	3–2	3–3	1–5	4–1	3–2	1–1	1–1	0–3	1–1	7–2
Brockenhurst	0–5	0–1	1–3	2–1	3–1	3–3	—	2–1	1–2	1–0	0–3	2–1	2–2	0–3	0–4	1–3	2–1	2–1	0–2	5–1
Christchurch	0–3	0–6	0–1	6–0	0–1	0–2	3–1	—	2–2	4–1	3–1	1–2	3–2	0–1	1–2	1–2	4–1	2–2	2–2	2–2
Cowes Sports	0–1	0–1	0–3	1–3	2–1	2–2	3–6	2–4	—	0–0	1–2	4–4	1–1	0–3	4–0	1–1	1–0	0–0	1–0	3–1
Downton	2–6	0–4	1–2	1–2	2–0	1–4	1–0	0–4	3–3	—	2–0	0–3	2–3	2–2	2–2	1–5	3–2	2–1	4–1	0–0
Fareham Town	0–3	0–0	0–1	2–1	2–0	2–0	3–1	3–0	1–1	4–2	—	2–0	1–0	6–1	9–0	5–0	0–1	0–3	3–0	0–2
Hamble Club	0–2	0–0	4–1	1–1	4–2	2–0	1–0	3–1	2–1	4–1	2–4	—	2–3	1–2	3–2	2–2	3–1	2–0	1–0	4–2
Hamworthy Recreation	1–2	0–3	0–2	1–4	3–1	2–0	2–0	3–1	8–0	2–0	2–3	1–5	—	1–0	2–3	0–4	3–2	1–0	3–0	7–2
Hythe & Dibden	0–3	0–5	4–0	1–1	3–2	1–5	1–3	2–2	0–2	0–0	3–2	1–2	3–0	—	1–3	3–2	2–2	1–5	3–2	2–4
Laverstock & Ford	2–3	1–1	2–2	0–3	3–2	3–2	6–0	0–1	2–5	1–0	1–2	1–3	0–3	5–4	—	2–3	2–3	0–1	1–1	1–0
Millbrook	0–2	1–1	1–1	1–0	1–2	3–1	5–1	2–6	3–2	2–0	1–5	0–1	0–2	3–0	0–1	—	5–0	3–3	1–0	2–2
Portland United	0–3	1–2	2–3	0–1	2–2	1–2	2–0	0–0	0–3	3–1	1–2	2–4	3–4	3–1	1–0	1–2	—	2–2	3–1	2–2
Sherborne Town	2–3	0–6	1–2	1–3	2–0	1–0	3–2	2–1	1–0	3–0	0–0	2–3	0–2	1–4	2–1	0–2	3–1	—	0–0	2–1
United Services Portsmouth	0–8	0–4	0–1	1–5	2–1	1–2	0–2	2–3	0–3	0–3	1–3	1–4	1–3	0–0	3–3	0–3	1–2	0–2	—	1–2
Wincanton Town	0–2	2–5	0–1	3–2	3–1	4–0	3–0	2–6	3–1	1–3	1–2	2–0	1–1	2–2	2–5	2–3	0–2	1–1	4–2	—

Source: FA Full-Time Grid
Legend: Blue = home team win; Yellow = draw; Red = away team win.
For upcoming matches, an "a" indicates there is an article about the rivalry between the two participants.

=== Stadia and locations ===
Location of the clubs in the 2024–25 Wessex Football League Premier Division (Dorset)
Location of the clubs in the 2024–25 Wessex Football League Premier Division (Hampshire)

Club	Location	Stadium	Capacity
A.F.C. Portchester	Fareham	Wicor Recreation Ground	
A.F.C. Stoneham	Eastleigh	Stoneham Lane Football Complex	1,000
Andover New Street	Charlton	Foxcotte Park	1,000
Baffins Milton Rovers	Portsmouth	PMC Stadium	
Blackfield & Langley	Fawley	Gang Warily Recreation Centre	2,500
Bournemouth	Bournemouth	Victoria Park	3,000
Brockenhurst	Brockenhurst	Grigg Lane	2,000
Christchurch	Hurn	Hurn Bridge Sports Club	2,000
Cowes Sports	Cowes	Westwood Park	2,000
Downton	Downton	Brian Whitehead Sports Ground	2,000
Fareham Town	Fareham	Cams Alder Stadium	5,500
Hamble Club	Hamble-le-Rice	Hamble Community Facility	
Hamworthy Recreation	Wimborne	Magna Road	1,500
Hythe & Dibden	Dibden	Clayfields Sport Centre	1,000
Laverstock & Ford	Laverstock	Church Road	
Millbrook	Southampton	Test Park	1,000
Portland United	Portland	Camp and Satherley Stadium	2,000
Sherborne Town	Sherborne	Raleigh Grove	1,150
United Services Portsmouth	Portsmouth	Victory Stadium	1,000
Wincanton Town	Wincanton	Wincanton Sports Ground	1,000

== Division One ==
Division One was reduced to 20 clubs from 21 after Downton, Hamworthy Recreation and Millbrook were promoted to the Premier Division, and Andover Town were relegated.

Three new teams joined the division:

- One relegated from the Premier Division:
  - Lymington Town
- One resigned from the 2023–24 Southern League Division One South:
  - Hamworthy United (not eligible for promotion as a consequence of their resignation from a higher league)
- One promoted from the Wiltshire League:
  - Amesbury Town

=== League table ===
Pos	Team	Pld	W	D	L	GF	GA	GD	Pts	Promotion, qualification or relegation
1	New Milton Town (C, P)	38	28	6	4	111	46	+65	90	Promoted to the Premier Division
2	Frimley Green	38	24	7	7	107	55	+52	79	Qualified for the play-offs
3	Alresford Town	38	22	8	8	74	47	+27	74	Qualified for the play-offs
4	East Cowes Victoria Athletic (O, P)	38	21	9	8	69	42	+27	72	Qualified for the play-offs
5	Fleetlands	38	19	9	10	69	61	+8	66	Qualified for the play-offs
6	Hamworthy United	38	19	5	14	84	62	+22	62	
7	Ringwood Town	38	16	13	9	73	64	+9	61	
8	Newport (IOW)	38	15	13	10	74	54	+20	58	
9	Amesbury Town	38	15	7	16	66	75	−9	52	
10	Cove	38	14	9	15	70	66	+4	51	
11	Whitchurch United	38	12	11	15	52	61	−9	47	
12	Clanfield	38	13	7	18	61	68	−7	46	
13	A.F.C. Aldermaston	38	14	3	21	65	84	−19	45	
14	Ash United	38	12	7	19	62	67	−5	43	
15	Lymington Town	38	12	7	19	55	82	−27	43	
16	Romsey Town	38	10	10	18	58	75	−17	40	
17	Totton & Eling	38	9	10	19	46	69	−23	37	
18	Folland Sports	38	9	9	20	43	80	−37	36	Reprieved from relegation
19	Fawley	38	9	6	23	45	78	−33	33	Reprieved from relegation
20	Verwood Town (R)	38	5	8	25	43	91	−48	23	Relegated to a county feeder league

Source: Wessex Leagues
Rules for classification: 1) points; 2) goal difference; 3) number of goals scored.
(C) Champions; (O) Play-off winners; (P) Promoted; (R) Relegated

=== Promotion playoffs ===
Semi-finals
2	Frimley Green	2
5	Fleetlands	1
3	Alresford Town	1
4	East Cowes Victoria Athletic	2

Final
2	Frimley Green	1 (1)
4	East Cowes Victoria Athletic	1 (4)

==== Semifinals ====
29 April	Frimley Green	2–1	Fleetlands	Frimley Green
19:45	Ciardini 70'; Everard 90+3'	Report		Stadium: The Frimley Green Recreation Ground; Attendance: 280

30 April	Alresford Town	1–2	East Cowes Victoria Athletic	New Alresford
19:45	Bryant	Report	Snow 63'; Wheeler 74'	Stadium: Alrebury Park; Attendance: 286

==== Final ====
3 May	Frimley Green	1–1 (1–4 p)	East Cowes Victoria Athletic	Frimley Green
15:00 GMT	Mekki 86'		Wheeler 49'	Stadium: The Frimley Green Recreation Ground; Attendance: 570

=== Results table ===
Home \ Away	ALD	ALR	AME	ASH	CLA	COV	ECV	FAW	FLN	FLS	FRG	HWU	LYM	NMT	NPT	RIN	ROM	T&E	VER	WHI
A.F.C. Aldermaston	—	1–2	6–1	1–4	1–0	0–3	0–3	2–0	1–3	4–1	0–4	2–1	2–0	0–2	3–1	0–4	2–2	3–2	2–1	5–4
Alresford Town	3–2	—	1–0	4–2	4–2	1–1	0–0	5–1	1–2	2–0	0–2	1–2	3–0	1–2	2–2	1–0	1–0	6–0	4–2	2–0
Amesbury Town	2–0	0–0	—	1–1	3–2	4–3	2–0	1–0	4–2	2–2	2–2	2–1	6–0	1–5	2–2	0–3	2–3	3–2	4–3	1–3
Ash United	2–2	0–2	1–2	—	0–4	3–2	1–1	2–1	5–0	1–2	1–1	2–1	1–1	2–3	1–2	1–2	2–1	0–1	1–0	1–0
Clanfield	3–1	0–2	3–1	1–2	—	1–0	0–2	2–1	3–4	1–0	2–2	2–2	4–0	0–2	3–1	0–3	2–2	0–2	3–1	1–0
Cove	2–1	3–0	1–0	0–2	2–2	—	0–2	3–1	1–2	6–0	1–3	1–3	2–4	0–4	2–0	2–2	3–0	1–0	2–1	2–3
East Cowes Victoria	4–2	0–0	1–0	3–2	3–1	1–0	—	5–0	3–0	1–2	2–1	2–1	2–4	2–4	2–0	1–3	7–0	2–2	2–1	0–0
Fawley	3–2	1–2	1–2	0–3	1–3	0–2	1–2	—	2–1	1–3	4–0	1–0	2–1	0–4	1–2	1–4	3–0	1–1	0–0	1–1
Fleetlands	2–0	2–0	4–1	3–2	1–0	1–3	2–1	1–0	—	2–2	2–1	3–3	1–0	1–2	2–2	3–3	0–0	1–0	4–1	1–2
Folland Sports	1–3	3–4	0–3	2–1	2–1	0–3	0–3	1–0	0–0	—	0–1	0–4	0–3	1–4	0–4	3–2	0–0	1–2	2–1	2–3
Frimley Green	6–2	2–2	3–0	4–2	2–1	1–1	4–1	7–2	3–1	4–0	—	3–2	3–1	1–1	2–2	3–1	3–1	2–0	6–2	3–1
Hamworthy United	2–1	0–1	4–3	3–2	7–3	4–3	1–2	4–1	2–3	1–1	4–0	—	6–1	2–3	2–1	2–0	2–1	1–2	3–1	3–2
Lymington Town	2–1	2–4	1–1	6–3	0–2	1–2	1–1	3–1	2–1	1–0	4–3	1–3	—	1–5	1–1	2–2	2–1	1–1	3–1	0–2
New Milton Town	4–2	4–0	3–0	3–3	4–0	4–0	4–2	3–0	2–2	2–1	4–5	2–0	2–0	—	2–3	1–2	5–3	3–1	3–0	2–0
Newport (IOW)	4–0	5–1	2–1	0–3	1–1	1–1	0–0	0–2	0–1	1–1	0–2	4–1	5–1	1–1	—	2–2	5–2	5–1	3–0	3–2
Ringwood Town	2–2	1–5	3–2	1–0	1–1	3–3	1–1	2–2	0–3	2–2	4–3	0–0	1–0	2–4	1–1	—	1–1	5–4	3–2	0–3
Romsey Town	0–2	1–2	1–1	2–1	4–3	4–2	0–1	2–2	4–4	3–1	0–2	1–2	1–2	4–1	1–3	3–0	—	2–1	3–0	1–3
Totton & Eling	1–2	2–2	4–1	2–0	1–0	1–1	1–2	0–3	5–0	1–4	0–6	0–3	1–1	1–1	0–0	0–1	1–1	—	1–0	1–2
Verwood Town	0–3	0–3	1–2	1–0	2–2	4–4	1–2	2–2	0–0	1–1	0–6	3–1	3–1	1–5	2–1	0–4	1–3	1–1	—	2–0
Whitchurch United	3–2	0–0	1–3	2–2	1–2	2–2	0–0	0–2	0–4	2–2	2–1	1–1	2–1	1–1	2–4	0–2	0–0	1–0	1–1	—

Source: FA Full-Time Grid
Legend: Blue = home team win; Yellow = draw; Red = away team win.
For upcoming matches, an "a" indicates there is an article about the rivalry between the two participants.

=== Stadia and locations ===
Location of the Hampshire clubs in the 2024–25 Wessex Football League Division One

Club	Location	Stadium	Capacity
A.F.C. Aldermaston	Aldermaston	Waterside Park (groundshare with Thatcham Town)	1,500
Alresford Town	New Alresford	Arlebury Park	1,000
Amesbury Town	Amesbury	Bonnymead Park	1,000
Ash United	Ash	Shawfield Road	2,500
Clanfield	Havant	Westleigh Park (groundshare with Havant & Waterlooville)	5,300
Cove	Farnborough	Squirrel Lane	
East Cowes Victoria	East Cowes	Beatrice Avenue	1,000
Fawley	Holbury	Waterside Sports & Social Club	1,000
Fleetlands	Gosport	DARA Fleetlands	1,000
Folland Sports	Hamble-le-Rice	Folland Park	1,000
Frimley Green	Frimley Green	Frimley Green Recreation Ground	2,000
Hamworthy United	Poole	County Ground	1,000
Lymington Town	Lymington	The Sports Ground	1,000
New Milton Town	New Milton	Fawcetts Field	3,000
Newport (IOW)	Newport	Beatrice Avenue (groundshare with East Cowes Victoria)	1,000
Ringwood Town	Ringwood	Long Lane	1,000
Romsey Town	Romsey	Southampton Road	
Totton & Eling	Southampton	Little Testwood Farm	1,500
Verwood Town	Verwood	Potterne Park	1,000
Whitchurch United	Whitchurch	Longmeadow	1,000
