= 2011–12 Wessex Football League =

Wessex Football League
- Season: 2011–12
- Champions: Winchester City

The 2011–12 Wessex Football League was the 26th season of the Wessex Football League. The league champions for the third time in their history were Winchester City, who were promoted to the Southern League. There was the usual programme of promotion and relegation between the two Wessex League divisions.

For sponsorship reasons, the league was known as the Sydenhams Wessex League.

== League tables ==
=== Premier Division ===
The Premier Division consisted of 22 clubs, the same as the previous season, after Poole Town were promoted to the Southern League, and Brockenhurst were relegated to Division One. Two new clubs joined:

- Downton, champions of Division One.
- Horndean, runners-up in Division One.
- Hamble A.S.S.C. changed their name to GE Hamble.

Pos	Team	Pld	W	D	L	GF	GA	GD	Pts	Qualification or relegation
1	Winchester City (C, P)	42	33	5	4	138	39	+99	104	Joined the Southern League
2	Bemerton Heath Harlequins	42	28	6	8	104	39	+65	90	
3	Christchurch	42	26	7	9	78	45	+33	85	
4	Moneyfields	42	26	6	10	105	62	+43	84	
5	GE Hamble	42	27	3	12	90	53	+37	84	
6	Downton	42	24	4	14	80	65	+15	76	
7	Hamworthy United	42	21	8	13	69	62	+7	71	
8	Romsey Town	42	21	4	17	77	66	+11	67	
9	Bournemouth	42	18	10	14	61	54	+7	64	
10	Alton Town	42	19	4	19	74	83	−9	61	
11	Totton & Eling	42	17	8	17	80	77	+3	59	
12	Fareham Town	42	14	14	14	77	68	+9	56	
13	Newport (IOW)	42	17	5	20	59	80	−21	56	
14	Lymington Town	42	16	5	21	63	78	−15	53	
15	Alresford Town	42	14	8	20	62	80	−18	50	
16	Blackfield & Langley	42	12	7	23	63	79	−16	43	
17	Horndean	42	10	8	24	47	68	−21	38	
18	Hayling United	42	10	8	24	59	104	−45	38	
19	Fawley	42	10	7	25	56	81	−25	37	
20	New Milton Town	42	10	6	26	64	108	−44	36	
21	Brading Town	42	10	6	26	54	102	−48	36	Left the league at the end of the season
22	Laverstock & Ford (R)	42	7	5	30	59	126	−67	26	Relegated to Division One

(C) Champions; (P) Promoted; (R) Relegated

=== Division One ===
Division One consisted of 18 clubs, reduced from 19 the previous season, after Downton and Horndean were promoted to the Premier Division, and Shaftesbury were relegated to the Dorset Premier League. Two clubs joined:

- Brockenhurst, relegated from the Premier Division.
- Team Solent, joining from the Hampshire League.

Pos	Team	Pld	W	D	L	GF	GA	GD	Pts	Promotion
1	Verwood Town (C, P)	34	25	5	4	91	38	+53	80	Promoted to the Premier Division
2	A.F.C. Portchester (P)	34	24	4	6	114	52	+62	76	Promoted to the Premier Division
3	Team Solent	34	19	7	8	75	52	+23	64	
4	East Cowes Victoria Athletic	34	19	6	9	82	46	+36	63	
5	Brockenhurst	34	18	9	7	72	41	+31	63	
6	Cowes Sports	34	15	5	14	62	45	+17	50	
7	Fleet Spurs	34	14	7	13	45	46	−1	49	
8	Whitchurch United	34	13	8	13	50	45	+5	47	
9	Ringwood Town	34	13	7	14	62	59	+3	46	
10	Andover New Street	34	13	10	11	53	56	−3	46 (Note: 3 points deducted)	
11	Pewsey Vale	34	12	8	14	51	61	−10	44	
12	Petersfield Town	34	12	3	19	67	74	−7	39	
13	United Services Portsmouth	34	11	6	17	59	69	−10	39	
14	Amesbury Town	34	9	7	18	55	93	−38	34	
15	Stockbridge	34	7	12	15	34	63	−29	33	
16	Warminster Town	34	8	8	18	56	83	−27	32	Transferred to the Western League
17	Tadley Calleva	34	8	4	22	39	82	−43	28	
18	Hythe & Dibden	34	6	4	24	47	109	−62	22	

(C) Champions; (P) Promoted
