= 2023–24 Wessex Football League =

Wessex Football League
- Season: 2023–24
- Champions: Moneyfields
- Promoted: Moneyfields; Shaftesbury
- Relegated: Lymington Town

The 2023–24 Wessex Football League season was the 38th in the history of the Wessex Football League since its establishment in 1986. The league consists of two divisions: the Premier Division and Division One.

The constitution was announced on 15 May 2023. Starting this season, the Premier Division (step 5) promotes two clubs; one as champions and one via a four-team play-off. This replaced the previous inter-step play-off system. For this season only, there was only one club relegated from the Premier Division.

== Premier Division ==
The Premier Division remained at 20 clubs, after Bemerton Heath Harlequins were promoted to the Southern League South Division; Horndean were promoted to the Isthmian League South East Division; Pagham were transferred to the Southern Combination League, and Alresford Town were relegated to Division One.

Four new teams joined the division:

- Two promoted from Division One:
  - Andover New Street
  - Petersfield Town
- One transferred from the Western League Premier Division:
  - Sherborne Town
- One demoted from the Southern League South Division:
  - Lymington Town

=== League table ===
Pos	Team	Pld	W	D	L	GF	GA	GD	Pts	Promotion, qualification or relegation
1	Moneyfields (C, P)	38	33	3	2	141	39	+102	99 (Note: Moneyfields had three points deducted for failing to fulfil a fixture.)	Promoted to the Southern League
2	A.F.C. Stoneham	38	31	2	5	131	26	+105	95	Qualification for the play-offs
3	Shaftesbury (O, P)	38	29	3	6	117	50	+67	90	Promoted to the Southern League
4	A.F.C. Portchester	38	25	6	7	90	44	+46	81	Qualification for the play-offs
5	Baffins Milton Rovers	38	21	4	13	88	52	+36	67 (Note: Christchurch 0–8 Baffins Milton Rovers (16 December 2023) and Lymington Town 1–3 Baffins Milton Rovers (6 January 2024) were voided after Baffins Milton Rovers fielded an ineligible player. Both matches were to be replayed. Replayed matches: Lymington Town 0–3 Baffins Milton Rovers (30 January 2024), Christchurch 1–3 Baffins Milton Rovers (20 April 2024).)	Qualification for the play-offs
6	Brockenhurst	38	19	10	9	77	47	+30	67	
7	Portland United	38	19	8	11	66	42	+24	65	
8	Laverstock & Ford	38	20	4	14	88	73	+15	64	
9	Sherborne Town	38	18	5	15	75	67	+8	59	
10	Fareham Town	38	16	5	17	68	80	−12	53	
11	Cowes Sports	38	15	6	17	83	75	+8	51	
12	Hamble Club	38	14	8	16	82	75	+7	50	
13	Petersfield Town	38	12	5	21	71	81	−10	41	Transferred to the Southern Combination
14	Andover New Street	38	11	6	21	62	92	−30	39	
15	Hythe & Dibden	38	10	5	23	60	87	−27	35	
16	Bournemouth	38	8	9	21	56	107	−51	33	
17	Blackfield & Langley	38	10	2	26	40	116	−76	32	
18	Christchurch	38	7	6	25	51	123	−72	27	
19	United Services Portsmouth	38	7	4	27	53	117	−64	25	
20	Lymington Town (R)	38	3	3	32	36	142	−106	12	Relegated to Division One

Source: Wessex League
Rules for classification: 1) points; 2) goal difference; 3) number of goals scored.
(C) Champions; (O) Play-off winners; (P) Promoted; (R) Relegated

=== Promotion playoffs ===
Semi-finals
2	A.F.C. Stoneham	2
5	Baffins Milton Rovers	1
3	Shaftesbury	1
4	A.F.C. Portchester	0

Final
2	A.F.C. Stoneham	0
3	Shaftesbury	1

==== Semifinals ====
23 April 2024	A.F.C. Stoneham	2–1	Baffins Milton Rovers	Eastleigh
19:45 GMT	Jenkins 74', Sampson 89'	Report	Robinson 51'	Stadium: Stoneham Football Complex; Attendance: 270

24 April 2O24	Shaftesbury	1–0	A.F.C. Portchester	Shaftesbury
19:45 GMT	Pitman	Report		Stadium: Cockrams; Attendance: 356

==== Final ====
27 April 2024	A.F.C. Stoneham	0–1	Shaftesbury	Eastleigh
15:00 GMT		Report	Pitman	Stadium: Stoneham Football Complex; Attendance: 534

=== Stadia and locations ===
Location of the clubs in the 2023–24 Wessex Football League Premier Division (Dorset)
Location of the clubs in the 2023–24 Wessex Football League Premier Division (Hampshire)

Club	Location	Stadium	Capacity
A.F.C. Portchester	Fareham	Wicor Recreation Ground	
A.F.C. Stoneham	Eastleigh	Stoneham Lane Football Complex	1,000
Andover New Street	Charlton	Foxcotte Park	1,000
Baffins Milton Rovers	Portsmouth	PMC Stadium	
Blackfield & Langley	Fawley	Gang Warily Recreation Centre	2,500
Bournemouth	Bournemouth	Victoria Park	3,000
Brockenhurst	Brockenhurst	Grigg Lane	2,000
Christchurch	Hurn	Hurn Bridge Sports Club	2,000
Cowes Sports	Cowes	Westwood Park	2,000
Fareham Town	Fareham	Cams Alder Stadium	5,500
Hamble Club	Hamble-le-Rice	Hamble Community Facility	
Hythe & Dibden	Dibden	Clayfields Sport Centre	1,000
Laverstock & Ford	Laverstock	Church Road	
Lymington Town	Lymington	The Sports Ground	1,000
Moneyfields	Portsmouth	John Jenkins Stadium	1,180
Petersfield Town	Petersfield	The Southdown Builders Stadium	3,000
Portland United	Portland	Camp and Satherley Stadium	2,000
Shaftesbury	Shaftesbury	Cockrams	1,000
Sherborne Town	Sherborne	Raleigh Grove	1,150
United Services Portsmouth	Portsmouth	Victory Stadium	1,000

== Division One ==
Division One was increased to 21 clubs from 20 after Andover New Street and Petersfield Town were promoted to the Premier Division, and Fleet Spurs and Amesbury Town were relegated.

Five new teams joined the division:

- One relegated from the Premier Division:
  - Alresford Town
- One relegated and transferred from the Combined Counties League Premier Division South:
  - Frimley Green
- Two transferred from the Combined Counties League Division One:
  - A.F.C. Aldermaston
  - Cove
- One promoted from the Hampshire Premier League:
  - Clanfield
- Downton were promoted on a PPG (points per game) basis despite losing the play-off final.

=== League table ===
Pos	Team	Pld	W	D	L	GF	GA	GD	Pts	Promotion, qualification or relegation
1	Hamworthy Recreation (C, P)	40	32	4	4	143	41	+102	100	Promoted to the Premier Division
2	Millbrook (O, P)	40	31	1	8	152	53	+99	94	Promoted to the Premier Division
3	Downton (P)	40	29	7	4	121	44	+77	94	Promoted (PPG) to the Premier Division
4	Alresford Town	40	24	9	7	108	56	+52	81	Qualification for the play-offs
5	Fleetlands	40	22	9	9	91	52	+39	75	Qualification for the play-offs
6	East Cowes Victoria Athletic	40	23	6	11	90	52	+38	75	
7	Cove	40	20	6	14	91	89	+2	66	
8	Folland Sports	40	19	7	14	78	75	+3	64	
9	Clanfield	40	16	9	15	93	67	+26	57	
10	Romsey Town	40	15	9	16	95	74	+21	54	
11	Fawley	40	16	6	18	54	69	−15	54	
12	Newport (IOW)	40	15	7	18	66	74	−8	52	
13	Whitchurch United	40	15	7	18	80	113	−33	52	
14	Verwood Town	40	14	6	20	69	85	−16	48	
15	Totton & Eling	40	14	5	21	54	99	−45	47	
16	Ringwood Town	40	11	10	19	74	90	−16	43	
17	Ash United	40	9	9	22	74	93	−19	36	
18	Frimley Green	40	10	3	27	58	118	−60	33	
19	New Milton Town	40	9	6	25	49	114	−65	33	Reprieved from relegation
20	A.F.C. Aldermaston	40	6	1	33	50	124	−74	19	Reprieved from relegation
21	Andover Town (R)	40	6	1	33	45	153	−108	19 (Note: 14 October 2023 – Romsey Town 2–3 Andover Town was voided after Andover were found to have fielded an ineligible player. The match was replayed on 19 March 2024, with Romsey winning 4–1.)	Relegated to Hampshire Premier League

Source: Wessex Leagues
Rules for classification: 1) points; 2) goal difference; 3) number of goals scored.
(C) Champions; (O) Play-off winners; (P) Promoted; (R) Relegated

=== Promotion playoffs ===
Semi-finals
2	Millbrook	5
5	Fleetlands	1
3	Downton	2
4	Alresford Town	0

Final
2	Millbrook	3
3	Downton	1

==== Semifinals ====
30 April 2024	Millbrook	5–1	Fleetlands	Southampton
19:45 GMT	Barker 3', White 14' 19' 84', O'Connell 60'	Report	Wrapson 66'	Stadium: Test Park; Attendance: 229

1 May 2024	Downton	2–0	Alresford Town	Downton
19:45 GMT	Smith, Osman			Stadium: Brian Whitehead Sports Ground; Attendance: 312

==== Final ====
4 May 2024	Millbrook	3–1	Downton	Southampton
15:00 GMT	White 33' (pen.), 43', Krysztofowicz 82'	Report	Davies 3'	Stadium: Test Park; Attendance: 532

=== Stadia and locations ===
Location of the clubs in the 2023–24 Wessex Football League Division One

Club	Location	Stadium	Capacity
A.F.C. Aldermaston	Aldermaston	Waterside Park (groundshare with Thatcham Town)	1,500
Alresford Town	New Alresford	Arlebury Park	1,000
Andover Town	Andover	Portway Stadium	3,000
Ash United	Ash	Shawfield Road	2,500
Clanfield	Havant	Westleigh Park (groundshare with Havant & Waterlooville)	5,300
Cove	Farnborough	Squirrel Lane	
Downton	Downton	Brian Whitehead Sports Ground	2,000
East Cowes Victoria	East Cowes	Beatrice Avenue	1,000
Fawley	Holbury	Waterside Sports & Social Club	1,000
Fleetlands	Gosport	DARA Fleetlands	1,000
Folland Sports	Hamble-le-Rice	Folland Park	1,000
Frimley Green	Frimley Green	Frimley Green Recreation Ground	2,000
Hamworthy Recreation	Wimborne	Magna Road	1,500
Millbrook	Southampton	Test Park	1,000
New Milton Town	New Milton	Fawcetts Field	3,000
Newport (IOW)	Newport	Beatrice Avenue (groundshare with East Cowes Victoria)	1,000
Ringwood Town	Ringwood	Long Lane	1,000
Romsey Town	Romsey	Southampton Road	
Totton & Eling	Southampton	Little Testwood Farm	1,500
Verwood Town	Verwood	Potterne Park	1,000
Whitchurch United	Whitchurch	Longmeadow	1,000
