= Dorset Senior Cup =

- Organiser(s): Dorset County FA
- Founded: 1887; 139 years ago
- Region: Dorset
- Teams: 10 (2024–25)
- Current champions: Weymouth (33rd title)
- Most championships: Weymouth (33 titles)
- Website: Dorset Senior Cup

The Dorset Senior Cup is a knockout cup competition involving association football teams from the county of Dorset, England, affiliated with the Dorset County Football Association. The current holders of the Dorset Senior Cup are Weymouth who beat Dorchester Town 2–0 in the final on 10 March 2025 at The Avenue Stadium in Dorchester.

The competition, founded initially in 1887 and in its current format in 1981, is open to all affiliated clubs at step 7 and above of the national league system. They must also have floodlights at their home grounds. The county FA headquarters is located at the County Ground in Hamworthy near Poole.

== Teams ==
A total of 12 teams competed for the 2023–24 season.

- Poole Town ^{(TH)} (SFL Premier Division South)
- Bridport (SWPL Premier Division East)
- Dorchester Town (SFL Premier Division South)
- Gillingham Town (Western League Division One)
- Hamworthy Recreation (Wessex League Division One)
- Portland United (Wessex League Premier Division)
- Shaftesbury (Wessex League Division One South)
- Sherborne Town (Wessex League Premier Division)
- Swanage Town & Herston (Dorset Premier Football League)
- Verwood Town (Wessex League Division One)
- Weymouth (National League South)
- Wimborne Town (SFL Premier Division South)

Note: TH: Title holder

== Previous winners ==
=== Key ===
Match went to a replay
Match went to extra time
Match decided by a penalty shootout after extra time
Shared trophy

Year	Winner	Result	Runner-up	Notes	Source
1888	Weymouth College	1–0	Dorchester Town		
1890			Dorchester Town		
1891			Poole Town		
1893			Poole Town		
1895	Poole Town				
1896			Poole Town		
1897	Poole Town				
1900			Poole Town		
1901			Poole Town		
1902	Poole Town				
1904	Poole Town				
1907	Poole Town				
1909	Bournemouth Gasworks Athletic				
1910	Bournemouth Gasworks Athletic				
1911	Bournemouth Gasworks Athletic		Poole Town		
1912	Bournemouth Gasworks Athletic				
1914	Bournemouth Gasworks Athletic				
1920	Weymouth	1–0	Bournemouth Gasworks Athletic		
1921	Bournemouth Gasworks Athletic				
1922	Bournemouth Gasworks Athletic				
1925	Bournemouth Gasworks Athletic				
1926			Poole Town		
1927	Poole Town				
1928			Poole Town		
1931	Bournemouth Gasworks Athletic				
1932	Weymouth	3–2	Bournemouth Gasworks Athletic		
1933	Portland United	4–3	Poole Town		
1934	Weymouth	2–1	Portland United		
1935	Blandford United	2–1	Weymouth	Replay; first match ended 2–2	
1936	Portland United	3–2	Weymouth		
1937			Poole Town		
1938	Poole Town				
1939	Bournemouth Gasworks Athletic				
1946	Longfleet St Mary's		Portland Dockyard		
1947	Poole Town				
1948	Weymouth	2–1	Portland United		
1949			Poole Town		
1951	Dorchester Town		Poole Town		
1955	Weymouth	5–3	Dorchester Town		
1956	Weymouth	Unknown	Poole Town		
1958	Weymouth	4–3	Dorchester Town		
1961	Dorchester Town		Shaftesbury		
1962			Poole Town		
1964	Bridport				
1968	Dorchester Town				
1969	Dorchester Town				
1970	Bridport				
1971	Bridport				
1972	Dorchester Town				
1973	Parley Sports				
1974	Parley Sports		Sherborne Town		
1975	Bridport		Poole Town		
1976	Bridport				
1977	Weymouth Reserves		Hamworthy United		
1978	Weymouth Reserves		Wareham Rangers		
1979	Bridport	2–0	Trinidad Bluebird	Replay	
1980	Bridport	4–1	Trinidad Bluebird		
1981	Bridport	2–1	Wimborne Town		
1982	St. Pauls	1–0	Wimborne Town		
1983	Trinidad Bluebird	2–0	St. Pauls		
1984	Sherborne Town	1–0	Bridport		
1985	Weymouth	4–2	Portland United	After extra-time	
1986	Weymouth	8–0	Wimborne Town		
1987	Weymouth	5–3	Swanage Town & Herston		
1988	Bridport	3–1	Poole Town		
1989	Poole Town	3–1	Dorchester Town	Replay. First match ended 2–2.	
1990	Swanage Town & Herston	1–0	Weymouth		
1991	Weymouth	5–1	Swanage Town & Herston		
1992	Wimborne Town	1–0	Bridport		
1993	Weymouth	4–0	Poole Town		
1994	Dorchester Town	1–0	Poole Town		
1995	Hamworthy Engineering	4–1	Poole Town		
1996	Dorchester Town	3–1	St. Paul's		
1997	Wimborne Town	2–0	Wareham Rangers		
1998	Poole Town	2–1	Hamworthy United		
1999	Weymouth	4–1	Wimborne Town		
2000	Weymouth	2–1	Wimborne Town		
2001	Dorchester Town	2–1	Weymouth	After extra-time.	
2002	Weymouth	1–1	Dorchester Town	Weymouth won 4–3 on penalties.	
2003	Dorchester Town	2–0	Weymouth		
2004	Sherborne Town	3–2	Poole Town		
2005	Bridport	1–0	Hamworthy United		
2006	Hamworthy United	2–1	Poole Town		
2007	Dorchester Town	2–1	Sherborne Town		
2008	Sherborne Town	2–1	Portland United		
2009	Poole Town	2–0	Dorchester Town	After extra-time.	
2010	Gillingham Town	2–1	Wimborne Town	After extra-time.	
2011	Dorchester Town	6–2	Weymouth		
2012	Dorchester Town	2–0	Wimborne Town		
2013	Poole Town	4–1	Wimborne Town		
2014	Poole Town	2–0	Hamworthy United		
2015	Weymouth	1–0	Dorchester Town		
2016	Weymouth	2–1	Gillingham Town		
2017	Weymouth	1–0	Gillingham Town	After extra-time.	
2018	Wimborne Town	7–0	Shaftesbury Town		
2019	Poole Town	5–0	Wimborne Town		
2020	Weymouth	4–2	Dorchester Town		
2022	Poole Town	2–1	Hamworthy United	After extra-time.	
2023	Poole Town	4–0	Weymouth		
2024	Hamworthy Recreation	3–1	Shaftesbury		
2025	Weymouth	2–1	Hamworthy Recreation		
2026	Weymouth	2–0	Dorchester Town	At Dorchester Town.	

=== Winners ===
Club	Wins	First final won	Last final won	Runner-up	Last final lost	Total final apps.
Weymouth	14 (33 total)	1888	2026	5	2023	38+
Poole Town	13	1895	2023	18	2006	35
Dorchester Town	12	1951	2012	6	2020	18
Bridport	9	1964	2005	2	1992	5
Wimborne Town	3	1992	2018	9	2019	12
Sherborne Town	3	1984	2008	1	2007	5
Hamworthy United	1	2006	2006	4	2022	5
Swanage Town & Herston	1	1990	1990	2	1991	3
Gillingham Town	1	2010	2010	2	2017	3
St. Pauls	1	1982	1982	1	1983	2
Trinidad Bluebird	1	1983	1983	0	–	1
Hamworthy Engineering	1	1995	1995	0	–	1
Hamworthy Recreation	1	2024	2025	1	2025	2
Blandford United F.C.	1	1935	1935	0	-	1

== Records & statistics ==
=== Finals ===
- Most final wins: 33
  - Weymouth
- Most final lost: 9
  - Wimborne Town
- Most consecutive finals win: 4
  - Bournemouth Gasworks Athletic (1909, 1910, 1911, 1912)
- Most consecutive finals lost: 3
  - Poole Town (1993, 1994, 1995)
- Most finals played without winning: 2
  - Portland United (1985, 2008)
  - Shaftesbury (2018, 2024)

=== Scoring ===
- Biggest winning margin in the final: 8 goals
  - Weymouth 8–0 Wimborne Town (1986)
- Highest scoring finals: 8 goals
  - Weymouth 8–0 Wimborne Town (1986)
  - Weymouth 5–3 Swanage Town & Herston (1987)
  - Dorchester Town 6–2 Weymouth (2011)
