= Dorset Football League =

Association football league in England

- Founded: 1896
- Country: England
- Number of clubs: 83
- Promotion to: Dorset Premier League
- Relegation to: Bournemouth Saturday League
- Current champions: Merley Cobham Sports Reserves (2023-24)

The Dorset Football League is a football competition based in England. It is a feeder to the Dorset Premier Football League, which is a level 11 league of the English football league system.

== Member clubs 2025–26 ==
=== Senior League ===
- Bournemouth Reserves
- Bournemouth Sports Reserves
- Cobham Sports Reserves
- Cranborne
- Maiden Newton & Cattistock
- Mere Town
- Puddletown
- Tisbury United
- Wareham Rangers
- Westland Sports Reserves
- Westover Bournemouth
- Wincanton Town Reserves

=== Division One ===
- Allendale
- Bere Regis
- ~~Blandford United Reserves~~
- Canford United
- ~~Dorchester Sports Reserves~~
- Milborne Port
- Mudeford
- Parley
- Portland Panthers
- Ridgeway
- Stars Academy
- Wilton

=== Division Two ===
- Beaminster
- Bournemouth Electric Reserves
- Corfe Castle
- Handley Sports
- Poole Borough Reserves
- Portesham
- Poundbury
- Sturminster Marshall
- Sturminster Newton United Reserves
- Swanage Town & Herston Reserves
- Shaftesbury Reserves

=== Division Three ===
- AFC Burton
- Broadstone
- Crossways Spitfires
- Devizes Inn United
- Durrington
- Hotspire
- Okeford United
- Piddlehinton United
- Pimperne
- Portland Panthers Reserves
- Stalbridge
- Witchampton United

=== Division Four ===
- Chickerell United
- Mere Town Reserves
- ~~Milborne & Parton~~
- Shillingstone
- Sturminster Marshall Reserves
- Symene
- Tisbury United Reserves
- Wareham Rangers Reserves
- Wessex Phoenix
- Weymouth Sports
- Witchampton United Reserves
- Wool United

=== Division Five ===
- AFC Damerham
- Beaminster Reserves
- Bournemouth Electric Development
- Bridport Development
- Corfe Mullen United
- Donhead United
- ~~Gillingham Town Development~~
- Longfleet
- Maiden Newton & Cattistock Reserves
- Puddletown Reserves
- Ridgeway Reserves
- Wool United Reserves

=== Division Six ===
- AFC Damerham Reserves
- Allendale Reserves
- Bournemouth Electric A
- Child Okeford
- Dorchester United
- Merley
- Milborne & Parton Reserves
- Poole Dolphins
- Stalbridge Reserves
- Wessex Phoenix Reserves
- Westham
- West Moors

== Champions ==
Season	Senior Division					
1896–87	Whiteheads					
1897–98	Weymouth					
1898–99	Bournemouth Wanderers					
1899–1900	Weymouth					
1900–01	Whiteheads					
1901–02	Whiteheads					
1902–03	Whiteheads					
1903–04	Poole					
1904–05						
1905–06	Whiteheads					
1906–07	Whiteheads					
1907–08						
1908–09	Yeovil Town					
1909–10						
1910–11						
1911–12	Blandford United					
1912–13	Bournemouth Gasworks Athletics					
1913–14	Weymouth Reserves					
1919–20	Bournemouth Gasworks Athletics					
1920–21	Bournemouth Gasworks Athletics					
1921–22	Weymouth Reserves					
1922–23	Yeovil & Petters United Reserves					
1923–24	Weymouth Reserves					
1924–25	Poole Reserves					
1925–26	Poole Reserves					
1926–27	Poole Reserves					
1927–28	Portland United					
1928–29	Portland United					
1929–30	Portland United					
1930–31	Poole Reserves					
1931–32						
1932–33						
1933–34						
1934–35						
1935–36						
1936–37						
1937–38	Dorchester Town					
1938–39						
1946–47						
1947–48						
1948–49						
1949–50						
1950–51						
1951–52						
1952–53						
1953–54						
1954–55						
1955–56						
1956–57						
1957–58						
1958–59						
1959–60						
1960–61						
1961–62						
1962–63						
1963–64						
1964–65						
1965–66						
1966–67						
1967–68						
1968–69						
1969–70						
1970–71						
1971–72						
1972–73						
1973–74						
1974–75						
1975–76						
1976–77						
1977–78						
1978–79						
1979–80						
1980–81						
1981–82						
1982–83						
1983–84						
1984–85						
1985–86						
1986–87						
1987–88						
1988–89						
1989–90						
1990–91						
1991–92						
1992–93						
1993–94						
1994–95						
1995–96						
1996–97						
1997–98						
1998–99						
1999–2000						
2000–01						
2001–02						
2002–03						
2003–04						
2004–05						
2005–06						
2006–07	Wincanton Town					
2007–08						
2008–09	Parley Sports					
Season	Senior Division	Division One	Division Two	Division Three	Division Four	
2009–10	Easton United	Kingston Lacy	Sturminster Marshall Reserves	Bridport 'A'	Corfe Mullen United	
Season	Senior Division	Division One	Division Two	Division Three	Division Four	Division Five
2010–11	Tintinhull	Piddletrenthide United	Mere Town	Corfe Mullen United	Poole Link	Cerne Abbas
2011–12	Portland United Reserves	Mere Town	11 Signal Regiment	AFC Cobham	Handley Sports	Mere Town Reserves
2012–13	Mere Town	Corfe Mullen United	The Balti House	Lytchett Red Triangle	Mere Town Reserves	Pimperne Sports Society
2013–14	Westland Sports	The Balti House	Lytchett Red Triangle	AFC Blandford	Puddletown	Portland United Youth
2014–15	Holt United	Westland Sports Reserves	Milborne Port	Wool & Winfrith	Portland United Youth	Marnhull
2015–16	Chickerell United	Milborne Port	Chickerell United Reserves	Portland United Youth	Marnhull	Okeford United
Season	Senior Division	Division One	Division Two	Division Three	Division Four	
2016–17	Witchampton United	Corfe Castle	Allendale Reserves	Sturminster Marshall	Bridport 'A'	
2017–18	Corfe Castle	Hamworthy United U18s	Sturminster Marshall	Gill Dons	Piddlehinton United Reserves	
2018–19	Westland Sports Reserves	Sturminster Marshall	Gill Dons	Wool United Reserves	Portland United Youth Reserves	
2019–20	Season abandoned due to COVID-19					
Season	Senior Division	Division One	Division Two	Division Three	Division Four	Division Five
2020–21	Season abandoned due to COVID-19					
2021–22	Sturminster Marshall	Bournemouth Electric	Parley	Handley Sports	Crossways Spitfires	Puddletown Reserves
2022–23	Bisterne United	Bournemouth Electric Reserves	Portland Panthers	Bere Regis	Corfe Castle	Woodville Wanderers
2023–24	Merley Cobham Sports Reserves	Mere Town	Westover Bournemouth	Mudeford Mens	Donhead United	Wyke Regis
Source: Non-League Matters FCHD
