= Wareham Rangers F.C. =

Association football club in England

- Full name: Wareham Rangers Football Club
- Founded: 1896
- Ground: Purbeck Sports Centre
- Chairman: Chris White
- Manager: Simon Landers
- League: Dorset Premier League
Home colours	Away colours

Wareham Rangers F.C. are a long running amateur football club based in Wareham — a historic market down situated in the Purbeck area in Dorset.

The club are affiliated to the Dorset County Football Association and run two adult and six youth sides. The Senior team have a long history of playing county league football.

== History ==
Wareham Rangers F.C. were founded in 1896 (originally as Wareham Town and then just Wareham) and spent their early days playing friendly fixtures before joining the Dorset Football League, where they held membership for many years.

In 1957, Wareham Rangers became founder members of the Dorset Combination and won the League Cup in 1963, after a thrilling 4–3 win over Portland United Reserves. They were losing finalists the following two seasons. In 1968 they were relegated, but returned three years later. Although they frequently struggled in the league, Wareham performed better in the cups, twice more reaching the league cup final and the 1978 Dorset Senior Cup final, when they were beaten by a strong Weymouth side.

In 2002, the Dorset Combination became known as the Dorset Premier League, but four years later Wareham finished bottom of the table and were relegated. After a spell of rebuilding, they were promoted back in 2012. This time, their form improved and they finished fifth, equalling their highest final position (achieved twice previously).

Tragedy struck in November 2022 when first team coach Rob Braid passed away on a match day. The trauma and suddenness of the incident shook the club to such a point that it was necessary for the well-being of everyone involved to withdraw and come to terms with the tragic events.

Wareham continued to operate in the Dorset League, maintaining the Reserves position in Division 1, which had recently been strengthened by an influx of new clubs from the now defunct Bournemouth League. After a spell of rebuilding, two successive promotions saw a return to the Dorset Premier League in 2026.

In 2025, the youth section was relaunched and the team earned the "Positive Behaviour Award" from the Dorset FA.

== Honours ==
- Dorset Football Association
  - Senior Cup Finalists 1977/78
- Dorset Premier League
  - League Cup Winners 1962/63, Finalists 1963/64, 1964/65, 1980/81 and 1989/90
- Dorset League
  - Senior Division Runners-up 2011/12 and 2025/26
  - Division 1 Runners-up 2024/25
  - Veterans League Champions 2018/19

== Playing Records ==
=== Dorset Premier League ===
Season	Position	Significant events
1957/58	?	
1958/59	?	
1959/60	?	
1960/61	?	
1961/62	?	
1962/63	?	League Cup winners
1963/64	?	League Cup finalists
1964/65	?	League Cup finalists
1965/66	?	
1966/67	?	
1967/68	?	Relegated
1968-71	-	
1971/72	?	
1972/73	?	
1973/74	?	
1974/75	?	
1975/76	?	
1976/77	?	
1977/78	?	Dorset Senior Cup Finalists
1978/79	?	
1979/80	9/18	
1980/81	6/18	
1981/82	11/18	
1982/83	7/18	
1983/84	9/18	
1984/85	10/18	
1985/86	12/18	
1986/87	17/18	
1987/88	6/19	
1988/89	11/18	
1989/90	14/17	League Cup finalists
1990/91	17/18	
1991/92	15/19	
1992/93	18/20	
1993/94	19/20	
1994/95	5/20	
1995/96	5/20	
1996/97	14/19	
1997/98	17/19	
1998/99	17/19	
1999/00	13/19	
2000/01	7/18	
2001/02	15/18	
2002/03	10/18	Competition renamed
2003/04	14/17	
2004/05	14/17	
2005/06	18/18	Relegated
2006-12	-	
2012/13	10/18	
2013/14	5/17	
2014/15	9/18	
2015/16	15/17	
2016/17	11/17	
2017/18	16/17	
2018/19	17/17	Re-elected
2019/20	-	season abandoned due to pandemic
2020/21	-	season abandoned due to pandemic
2021/22	17/18	
2022/23	18/18	Withdrew
2023-26	-	
2026/27	?/18	

=== FA Cup ===
Season	Round	Opponents	Result
1913/14	Extra-Preliminary Round	A v Christchurch	L 2-6

=== FA Amateur Cup ===
Season	Round	Opponents	Result
1913/14	2nd Qualifying Round	A v RGA Weymouth	L 1-4
1921/22	Preliminary Round	A v Westham	L 2-5

== Ground ==
Wareham Rangers Football Club play at Purbeck Sports Centre, Wareham, Dorset, BH20 4PN.

The venue is owned by Dorset County Council. It has a large car park and pavilion. The main football pitch is enclosed with a small wooden stand for spectators.

== Notable players ==
The Wareham Rangers have had many players - notably goalkeeper David Best, who was born in the town and played for the club in his youth before a professional career with AFC Bournemouth, Oldham Athletic, Ipswich Town and Portsmouth. He was later player-manager of Dorchester Town.

== Local rivalries ==
Purbeck neighbours Swanage Town & Herston and Corfe Castle are regarded their two main local rivals. Their meetings generate much interest and attract large crowds.
