= Sturminster Newton United F.C. =

English football club

Coordinates: 50°56′09″N 2°18′05″W

Sturminster Newton United
- Full name: Sturminster Newton United; Football Club
- Nickname: The Cherries
- Founded: 1871 (as Panthers)
- Ground: Barnetts Field, Sturminster Newton
- Capacity: 600
- Manager: Nick Squires
- League: Wessex League Premier Division
- 2025–26: Western League Division One, 2nd of 20 (promoted via play-offs)
Home colours	Away colours

Sturminster Newton United Football Club is a football club based in Sturminster Newton, Dorset, England, currently playing in the Wessex League Premier Division. The club is affiliated to the Dorset County Football Association and is a FA Charter Standard Community Club. Currently have 9 youth teams ranging from under 8s to under 16s, playing in the Dorset mini soccer league and Dorset youth league.

== History ==
In 1874 the club, which was then known as Panthers FC, and based in Blandford Forum, playing in brown and yellow hoops, became the first ever club from the West Country to participate in the FA Cup, reaching the second round on three occasions. In 1877–78, they played the legendary Wanderers in the first round, but lost 9–1. In the 1890s, their name was changed to Sturminster St Marys, with the current name adopted in 1945.

They were among the founding members of the Dorset Combination in 1957, having played previously in the Dorset League. After leaving the league due to financial difficulties in 1960, they played in the lower Dorset Senior League until they rejoined the Combination in 1972. They remained in that competition (since 2002 renamed the Dorset Premier League) until 2011 when they were relegated to the Dorset Senior League, during which time they won the Combination cup twice, in 1981 and 1995. They moved from a public recreation ground to their own stadium at Honeymead Lane in 1996.

In 2011–12 under manager , in his first full season in charge, the club won the Dorset Senior Trophy with a 1–0 win over Parley Sports at Wimborne Town.

They are currently being managed by Nick Squires.

They also managed promotion to the sixth step for the first time in their history with a win on 4 May 2024 with one game left. They have also reached the 2024–25 Dorset Senior Trophy semi-finals.

== Ground ==
Sturminster Newton United play their games at the We Heat South Stadium, Honeymead Lane. The ground has a clubhouse and bar for Home fans and receives an attendance of around 100 people each week in the 600 capacity stadium. It has a sheltered and open terrace, seating capacity for 50 spectators with floodlit pitch. The club moved to this ground in 1996.

== Club honours ==
- Dorset League Division One:
  - Winners: 1971–72
- Dorset Senior Trophy:
  - Winners: 2011–12
- Dorset Combination League Cup:
  - Winners: 1980–81, 1995–96
- Dorset Senior Amateur Cup:
  - Runners-up: 1961–62
- Dorset Junior Cup:
  - Runners-up: 1910–11
- Mark Frowd Memorial Cup winners 2016
- 23/24 Dorset Premier League Winners:

== Club records ==
- Best league performance: 1st in Dorset Combination, 2023–24
- Best FA Cup performance: Second round, 1875–76, 1876–77, 1878–79 (as Panthers); Extra preliminary round, 2026–27 (as Sturminster Newton United)
- Best FA Vase performance: Third round, 2025–26
- Highest attendance: 600 vs Weymouth in 1986

== Former players ==
1. Players that have played/managed in the football league or any foreign equivalent to this level (i.e. fully professional league).
2. Players with full international caps.

- (Wales) Ken Wookey
