= Jake Thomson =

English footballer (born 1989)

Personal information
- Full name: Jake Samuel Thomson
- Date of birth: 12 May 1989 (age 37)
- Place of birth: Portsmouth, England
- Height: 5 ft 11 in (1.80 m)
- Position: Midfielder

Team information
- Current team: AFC Stoneham

Youth career
- 2005–2008: Southampton

Senior career*
Years	Team	Apps	(Gls)
2008–2010	Southampton	14	(0)
2009	→ Bournemouth (loan)	6	(1)
2009–2010	→ Torquay United (loan)	15	(1)
2010–2011	Exeter City	16	(0)
2011	→ Cheltenham Town (loan)	5	(1)
2011	→ Kettering Town (loan)	4	(0)
2011–2012	Forest Green Rovers	28	(0)
2012–2013	Newport County	22	(0)
2012	→ Lincoln City (loan)	3	(0)
2013	Salisbury City	6	(0)
2014–2015	A.F.C. Portchester	0	(0)
2015–2016	Bognor Regis Town	0	(0)
2016–2017	Havant & Waterlooville	4	(0)
2017–2019	Gosport Borough		
2019	Fareham Town		
2020–2021	Horndean	6	(0)
2021–2022	AFC Stoneham	30	(10)
2022	Brockenhurst	13	(0)
2022–2023	AFC Stoneham	11	(3)
2023–2024	Petersfield Town	21	(4)
2024–	AFC Stoneham	18	(1)

International career
2006	England U17	4	(1)
2009	Trinidad and Tobago U20	4	(0)
2009	Trinidad and Tobago	2	(0)
- * Club domestic league appearances and goals as of 12:51, 6 January 2025 (UTC)

Jake Samuel Thomson (born 12 May 1989) is a semi-professional footballer who plays as a midfielder for AFC Stoneham.

Before playing in non-League football, Thomson played in the Championship for Southampton. A youth international footballer for England, he played at senior international level for Trinidad and Tobago.

== Club career ==
Thomson began his career at Southampton in 2005 and was promoted to the first team in 2008, making his debut on 9 August 2008 against Cardiff City in the Football League Championship. He made a further nine appearances for Southampton in the 2008–09 season. Thomson spent one month on loan to Bournemouth between January and February 2009; although the clubs had agreed to extend the loan, this was not permitted because of Bournemouth's financial circumstances.

Thomson made four appearances for Southampton in the 2009–10 Football League One. On 27 October 2009, he joined Torquay United on loan for a month. The loan was extended until the end of the 2009–10 season.

He was released by Southampton on 15 May 2010.

On 1 July 2010, he was signed by Exeter City. On 25 February 2011, Jake signed on loan to Cheltenham for an initial one-month loan. He was one of twelve players released by Exeter in May 2011.

Thomson spent the summer of 2011 on trial with Southend United however he failed to earn a deal. Thomson subsequently signed for Conference National outfit Kettering Town.

Shortly after joining Kettering however on 27 September 2011, Thomson joined fellow Conference National side Forest Green Rovers on loan. He made his Forest Green debut on the day he signed, coming on as a second-half substitute in a 1–1 draw with Newport County at The New Lawn. In October 2011, Thomson had his loan deal extended at Forest Green by a further month. In November 2011 it was announced that Thomson's loan spell at Forest Green would be turned into a permanent move. After making 28 league appearances for Forest Green, Thomson was released by the club in May 2012. He signed for Newport County on 11 June 2012. In January 2013 Thomson joined Lincoln City on a one-month loan and he returned to Newport County in February 2013. In the 2012–13 season he was part of the Newport team that finished 3rd in the league, reaching the Conference National playoffs. Newport County won the playoff final versus Wrexham at Wembley stadium 2–0 to return to the Football League after a 25-year absence with promotion to League Two.

He was released by Newport County on 10 May 2013.

It was announced on 19 August 2013 that he had signed for Salisbury City but left the club in December 2013 after making just six league appearances. On 14 January 2014 he joined A.F.C. Portchester whose coach Louis Bell had been his coach when he was a member of the Portsmouth Schools side who lifted the English Schools' Football Association Under 15 Inter Association Trophy in 2004.

In April 2019, Thomson joined Wessex League Premier Division side Fareham Town from Gosport Borough.

After a break from football, Thomson joined Horndean in August 2020. The following season he was playing for AFC Stoneham. Thomson joined Brockenhurst in July 2022. In November 2022, he rejoined AFC Stoneham as a player/coach. In his first appearance back at the club, he scored a hat-trick against the side he had just left, Brockenhurst. In December 2023, he joined Petersfield Town.

== International career ==
Thomson was born in Portsmouth and is of Trinidadian parentage but played for the England U-17 team. On 30 August 2009 it was announced that Thomson would be joining the Trinidad and Tobago squad prior to the 2009 FIFA U-20 World Cup.

He made his full international debut versus Costa Rica on 10 October 2009 in a World Cup qualifier.
