= Jamie Gleeson =

English footballer

Personal information
- Date of birth: 15 January 1985 (age 41)
- Place of birth: Poole, England
- Position: Midfielder

Senior career*
Years	Team	Apps	(Gls)
2002–2004	Southampton	0	(0)
2004–2005	Kidderminster Harriers	7	(0)
2005–2006	→ Eastleigh (loan)	3	(0)
2006–2015	Dorchester Town		
2015–	Poole Town	0	(0)
2025-	Poole Borough	0	(0)
- * Club domestic league appearances and goals

Jamie Gleeson (born 15 January 1985) is an English footballer who plays for Poole Borough.

== Career ==
Gleeson was born in Poole and began his career as a trainee at Southampton before joining Kidderminster Harriers in 2004. He played seven matches in the Football League with the Harriers before returning south to Eastleigh and then Dorchester Town.

On 4 June 2015, after a 10-year spell with Dorchester Town, Gleeson signed with Poole Town on a one-year deal.

Gleeson also works as a David Beckham impersonator.
