= Cobham Sports F.C. =

Football club based in Poole, Dorset, England

Cobham Sports
- Full name: Cobham Sports Football Club
- Founded: 1949
- Ground: Cobham Sports & Social Club, Merley
- Chairman: Martin Cherrett
- Manager: Andrew Dillworth
- League: Dorset Premier League
- 2024–25: Dorset Premier League, 2nd of 16
Home colours	Away colours

Cobham Sports Football Club is a football club based in Merley, in Poole, Dorset, England. The club is affiliated to the Dorset County Football Association and is a FA chartered Standard club. They play their home games at Cobham Sports and Social Club and are currently members of the Dorset Premier League.

== History ==
The club was established in 1949 as Flight Refuelling F.C. and played in the local Dorset leagues. The club managed to work its way up the leagues and joined the Dorset Combination league for the start of the 1958–59 season. However, they only lasted two seasons in the league and had to wait until the 1977–78 season. Their first season back in the Dorset Combination league was a complete success as they finished the season as champions. Four seasons later in the 1980–81 campaign, the club made their debut in the FA Vase and continued playing in the competition until the end of the 1994–95 season when new ground regulations stopped them entering the competition. They changed their name to Cobham Sports F.C. in 2001.

At the start of the 2010–11 season the club merged with Merley Allendale Youth FC, and changed their name to Merley Cobham Sports F.C. In May 2012, the club was awarded its FA chartered Standard. The club reverted to the name of Cobham Sports F.C. in 2024.

== Ground ==
Cobham Sports play their home games at Cobham Sports & Social Club, Merley Park, Wimborne, BH21 3DA.

== Honours ==
=== League honours ===
- Dorset Premier Football League :
  - Winners (1): 1977–78
  - Runners-up (3): 1987–88, 1989–90, 1990–91

=== Cup honours ===
- Dorset Premier Football League Cup:
  - Winners (3): 1979–80, 1982–83, 1990–91
  - Runners Up (3): 1981–82, 1985–86, 2010–11

== Records ==
- Highest League Position: 1st in Dorset Premier Football League 1977–78
- FA Vase best performance: First Round 1980–81, 1983–84, 1985–86
