= Blandford United F.C. =

Association football club in England

- Full name: Blandford United Football Club
- Nickname: The Royals
- Founded: 1893 (earliest recorded result)
- Ground: Blandford Recreation Ground, Blandford Forum
- Capacity: 750 standing Planning application accepted for a 100 seat stand
- Chairman: Stephen Powell
- Manager: Dan Holland
- League: Wessex League Division One
- 2025–26: Dorset Premier League, 1st of 18 (promoted)
Home colours	Away colours

Blandford United Football Club is a football club based in Blandford Forum, Dorset, England. The club was a founding member of the Dorset Combination in 1957. The club is affiliated to the Dorset County Football Association and is a FA chartered Standard club. They are currently members of the Wessex League Division One. They play their games at Blandford Recreation Ground.

== History ==
The club was formed on October 1, 1882, and were inaugural members of the South Hants and Dorset Football Association in 1884, which became part of the Dorset FA in 1887.

In 1896–97 the club became founder members of the Dorset League, finishing in fifth place out of eight. They stayed there up and till the First World War when football was suspended in the Dorset league and returned to the League after the First World War in 1919–20 finishing fourth place out of nine.

In the 1920–21 season they reached the third Qualifying round of the FA Cup beating East Cowes Victoria 3–2 (a) in the preliminary round, Boscombe (now AFC Bournemouth) 2–1 in a replay (h) after a 1–1 draw, Bournemouth Amateurs 2–0 (h), before losing 0–1 at Cowes.

The team continued to play in the Dorset League 1 but during the summer of 1924 an amalgamation took place between the club and Blandford Institute, who had been playing in Dorset League 2 to form the current club, Blandford United, with a reserve side in Division 2.

In the 1934–35 season the club won the Dorset Senior Cup for the first time, beating Weymouth 2–1 after a drawn match.

After the second world war the ground was unplayable owing to anti-tank traps, and they had to wait sometime before it could be used again. In 1957 the club left the Dorset league, to play in the Dorset Combination League which had just been created and the club won the Division 1 championship. They stayed in the league until 1964, having to leave due to a lack of players and money, but rejoined again in 1967 and two seasons later Blandford United won the league. The club then went on to win the league again in the 1974–75 and 1982–83 seasons, while also collecting a number of league cups during the 1970s. The club entered the FA Vase for the first time in 1984–85 season, but only continued entering this competition for a further two seasons.

The 1991–92 season saw the club's previous league championship win, after which it remained in the Dorset Combination League (now the Dorset Premier League) until securing the title again in the 2025–26 season. The club has since been promoted to Step 6 of the National League System for the first time in their history.

== Ground ==
Blandford United play their games at Blandford Recreation Ground, Park Road, Blandford Forum DT11 7DB.

== Honours ==
- Dorset Premier League
  - Winners: 1957–58, 1969–70, 1975–76, 1982–83, 1991–92, 2025 —26
  - Runners Up: 1979–80
- Dorset Senior Cup
  - Winners: 1934–35 Where they beat Weymouth F.C. In a replay 2-1 after the first match ended 2-2
- Dorset Combination Cup
  - Winners: 1974–75, 1978–79, 1983–84

== Club Records ==
- Highest League Position: 1st in Dorset Premier League: 1957–58, 1969–70, 1975–76, 1982–83, 1991–92, 2025—26
- FA Cup best performance: Third qualifying round – 1920–21
- FA Vase best performance: 2nd qualifying round - 2026-27 where they lost to Sherborne Town F.C. 3-0
- Dorset Senior Cup best performance: Champions 1934-1935

== Former players ==
1. Players that have played/managed in the Football League or any foreign equivalent to this level (i.e. fully professional league).
2. Players with full international caps.
3. Players that hold a club record or have captained the club.

- (England) George Bristow
