= Hamworthy Recreation F.C. =

Coordinates: 50°46′50″N 1°56′54″W

Hamworthy Recreation
- Full name: Hamworthy Recreation Football Club
- Nickname: The Rec
- Founded: 1948; 78 years ago
- Ground: Magna Road, Merley
- Manager: Wayne Smith
- League: Wessex League Premier Division
- 2024–25: Wessex League Premier Division, 7th of 20
- Website: hamworthyrecreationfc.co.uk
Home colours

Hamworthy Recreation Football Club is a football club based in Merley, England. They are currently members of the Wessex League Premier Division and play at Magna Road.

== History ==
The club was formed in 1948 as Hamworthy Engineering FC and played on the Sports Ground opposite the factory at Fleetsbridge in Poole (where the Tesco supermarket now stands). When the site at Fleetsbridge was sold to Tesco in the late 1980s the football, along with the Sports & Social Club, moved to its current home at Magna Road, Canford Magna. At that time they were playing in the Bournemouth League (Division 1). The 2000–01 season saw the Club change its name to Hamworthy Recreation FC to reflect the name of their current headquarters. In May 2022, the club earned promotion to the Wessex League. They were crowned champions of the 2023–24 Wessex League Division One.

== Team Honours ==
- Wessex Football League
  - Division One champions: 2023–24
- Dorset Premier Football League
  - Champions: 2000–01, 2001–02, 2004–05, 2009–10, 2010–11, 2014–15
  - Runner-up: 2011–12
- Dorset Senior Cup
  - Champions: 1994–95, 2023–24
  - Runner-up: 2024–25
- Other
  - Bournemouth League Division 1 Champions 1991-92
  - Bournemouth Senior Cup Winners 1988-89

== Records ==
- FA Cup best performance: Preliminary round (2024–25)
- FA Vase best performance: Fourth round (2023–24)
