= Merley =

Housing estate in Poole, Dorset, England

Coordinates: 50.78427°N 1.97016°W

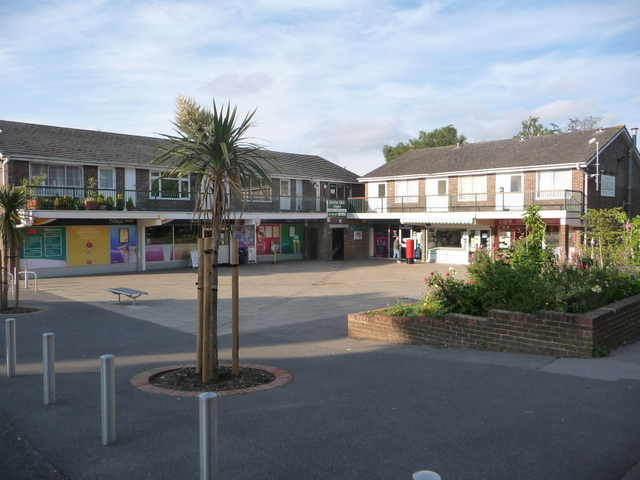
Oakley shops at Merley

Merley is a large housing estate in Poole, a mile (2 km) south of Wimborne Minster. Originally called Myrle, Merley was a manor in the tithing of Great Canford (or Canford Magna). The village merges with that of Oakley, and the housing estate was originally going to be called "Oakley Garden Village", note Oakley Shops and other signposts around the community but the name was changed. The housing estate only covers part of the area that was originally called Merley/Myrle. The Poole ward is Merley and Bearwood. The population of this ward taken at the 2011 census was 10,392.

== Statistics ==
Merley is part of the greater ward called "Merley and Bearwood" and here are some statistics on this area:

=== People ===
- 10,392 people live in Merley and Bearwood.
- There are about 4078 dwellings in the ward
- There are 2228 people over the age of 60 living in this ward
- 52.54% of people over the age of 16 are currently married.

=== Housing ===
- 88.99% of residents either own their homes outright or with a mortgage.
- 5.27% of residents live in council or housing association homes.
- 4.27% of residents live in privately rented homes.

=== Environment ===
- The population density of Merley and Bearwood is approximately 1673 people per square mile (646/km^{2}).
- The actual size of the ward is 6.4 square miles (17 km^{2}).

=== Employment ===
- The biggest industry in this area (with 16.62% of people) are the wholesale and retail trade motor mechanic industries.
- The biggest male industry in this area (with 21.86% of males) is the manufacturing industry.
- The biggest females industry in this area (with 21.84% of females) is the health and social work industry.

Source: First release of the 2001 Census data, released in September 2002.

== History ==
The 1970s housing estate surrounding Sopwith Crescent was built over a period of several years from the Oakley Straight end on former farmland. It was originally called Oakley Garden Village by the developers, but soon became incorporated into the adjacent older village.

== Education and schools ==
Merley First School serves Merley and Oakley and is one of the founding members of the Wimborne Academy Trust. The private Canford School is also located nearby at Canford Magna.

== Sport and leisure ==
Merley has a Non-League football club Merley Cobham Sports F.C. who play at Cobham Sports and Social Club.

== Politics ==
Merley is part of the Bearwood and Merley ward, which elects 3 councillors to Bournemouth, Christchurch and Poole Council.
