= Parley F.C. =

Association football club in England

- Full name: Parley Football Club
- Nickname: Pars
- Founded: 1949 (reformed 2021)
- Ground: West Parley Community Hub, Christchuch Road
- Chairman: Leah La Ronde
- Manager: Matthew White
- League: Dorset League
- Website: parleysportsfc
Home colours	Away colours

Parley F.C. is a long-running amateur football club based in West Parley, a village and civil parish located near Ferndown in south-east Dorset.

They represent the football section of the parent Sports Club and are affiliated to the Dorset County Football Association. The men's first team are members of the Dorset League whilst the club also run numerous youth sides from U8's upwards and a ladies team, who play in the Dorset Women's League and have entered national competitions.

The club hold the record for winning the Dorset Premier League (level 11 on the current pyramid system) on the most occasions (12).

== History ==
The Parley Sports Club was formed in 1949 by a group of ex-National servicemen and their fathers who decided there was a need to establish a sports club in their community. Football and cricket teams were subsequently formed and entered into local competitions.

After moving to their newly-opened sports complex in 1961, the football team enjoyed great success. Two years later they were promoted to the Dorset Combination (now known as the Dorset Premier League) and proceeded to be champions and league cup winners five years running, as well as winning the Bournemouth Senior Cup.

The seventies and eighties saw Parley remain a dominant force within the competition under the chairmanship of Trevor Williams, regularly challenging for silverware - winning the title a further five times, the League Cup four times and both the Dorset Senior and Bournemouth Senior Cups twice. Their twelve league championships is a competition record. However, by the mid-nineties their fortunes gradually declined and they left the competition in 2000.

After a spell of rebuilding in the Bournemouth League, Parley returned to the Dorset Premier League in 2009, where they became a steady midtable side. There was cup glory in 2017 when they defeated Holt United 2-1 in the final of the Dorset Trophy, but two years later they were made homeless after the lease was terminated. Consequently, this resulted in the team moving to neighbours Bournemouth Sports - retaining their status under their identity.

By 2021, a new lease had been agreed with the sports ground receiving a much needed revamp thanks to various grants and efforts by local volunteers and the council. A new football team was subsequently formed as Parley F.C. and joined the Dorset League. They won the Division 2 title at the first attempt and have since risen to the Senior Division for the 2026-27 season.

== Honours ==
- Dorset Premier League
  - Champions 1962–63, 1963–64, 1964–65, 1965–66, 1966–67, 1971–72, 1972–73, 1973–74, 1975–76, 1979–80, 1983–84 and 1984–85. Runners-up 1967–68, 1976–77, 1977–78, 1982–83, 1985–86, 1986–87 and 1998–99
  - League Cup Winners 1962–63, 1963–64, 1964–65, 1966–67, 1967–68, 1969–70, 1970–71, 1971–72, 1974–75, 1976–77 and 1985–86. Finalists 1966–69, 1972–73, 1973–74, 1975–76, 1978–79, 1979–80, 1986–87, 1991–92 and 1998–99
- Dorset League
  - Division 2 Champions 2021–22
- Bournemouth League
  - Division 1 Champions
  - Division 2 Champions
- Dorset Football Association
  - Senior Cup Winners 1972–73 and 1973–74
  - Trophy Winners 2016–17
- Bournemouth Football Association
  - Senior Cup Winners 1964–65, 1971–72 and 1972–73

== Dorset Premier League career ==
Season	Position	Significant events
1962–63	1st	League Cup winners
1963–64	1st	League Cup winners
1964–65	1st	League Cup & Bournemouth Senior Cup winners
1965–66	1st	
1966–67	1st	League Cup winners
1967–68	2nd	League Cup winners
1968–69	?	League Cup finalists
1969–70	?	League Cup winners
1970–71	?	League Cup winners
1971–72	1st	League Cup & Bournemouth Senior Cup winners
1972–73	1st	League Cup finalists & Bournemouth Senior Cup winners
1973–74	?	League Cup finalists
1974–75	?	League Cup winners
1975–76	1st	League Cup finalists
1976–77	?	
1977–78	?	
1978–79	?	League Cup finalists
1979–80	1/18	League Cup finalists
1980–81	3/18	
1981–82	2/18	
1982–83	2/18	
1983–84	1/18	
1984–85	1/18	
1985–86	2/18	
1986–87	2/18	League Cup finalists
1987–88	5/19	
1988–89	3/18	
1989–90	12/17	
1990–91	14/18	
1991–92	3/19	League Cup finalists
1992–93	10/20	
1993–94	17/20	
1994–95	17/20	
1995–96	16/20	
1996–97	16/19	
1997–98	4/19	
1998–99	2/19	League Cup finalists
1999–00	5/19	Left competition
2000–09	-	
2009–10	10/18	
2010–11	10/18	
2011–12	8/19	
2012–13	9/18	
2013–14	13/17	
2014–15	6/18	
2015–16	7/17	
2016–17	9/17	Dorset Trophy winners
2017–18	12/17	
2018–19	12/17	Left competition

== Ground ==
Parley F.C play at West Parley Community Hub (formerly Parley Sports Club), Christchurch Road, West Parley. Owned by West Parley Parish Council, the 8-acre site is shared between the football, cricket, and pétanque sections of the Sports Club.

The clubhouse was officially opened October 13th 1961 by cricket commentator John Arlott, and re-opened to the community after refurbishment November 5th 2025.

== Notable players ==
Former Parley players include prolific striker Terry Mitchell, who broke all goal-scoring records during the late sixties and seventies, and goalkeeper David Best, who was player-manager in the early eighties after a long professional career with AFC Bournemouth, Oldham Athletic, Ipswich Town and Portsmouth.

Other notable players include Eddie Howe who played in the youth section in 1994 before joining AFC Bournemouth, ex Wolves and England international Bobby Mason and former cherries star Billy Coxon.

== Local rivalries ==
Parley have a number of local rivals including Christchurch, Westover Bournemouth, Bournemouth Sports and Bournemouth Electric.
