= David Best (footballer) =

English footballer (1943–2025)

Personal information
- Date of birth: 6 September 1943
- Place of birth: Wareham, Dorset, England
- Date of death: 9 December 2025 (aged 82)
- Position: Goalkeeper

Senior career*
Years	Team	Apps	(Gls)
1960–1966	Bournemouth & Boscombe Athletic	230	(0)
1966–1968	Oldham Athletic	98	(0)
1968–1974	Ipswich Town	168	(0)
1974–1975	Portsmouth	53	(0)
1975–1980	AFC Bournemouth	2	(0)
Total		551	(0)
- * Club domestic league appearances and goals

David Best (6 September 1943 – 9 December 2025) was an English professional footballer. A goalkeeper, he made over 200 appearances for AFC Bournemouth, nearly 100 appearances for Oldham Athletic and 168 appearances for Ipswich Town between 1968 and 1974.

== Biography ==
Best was born in Wareham, Dorset. Best began his career with Bournemouth and Boscombe Athletic F.C. in October 1960. He was player-manager at Dorchester Town F.C. in February 1976 and held leadership roles at Portesham, Poole Town, Cranborne and Parley Sports. Best died on 9 December 2025, at the age of 82.
