= A.F.C. Portchester =

Association football club in England

Coordinates: 50°50′40″N 1°08′57″W

AFC Portchester
- Full name: Association Football Club Portchester
- Nicknames: Portchy, Royals
- Founded: 1971
- Ground: Wicor Recreation Ground, Portchester
- Chairman: Paul Kelly
- Manager: Gav Spurway
- League: Isthmian League South Central Division
- 2025–26: Isthmian League South Central Division, 5th of 22
Home colours	Away colours

A.F.C. Portchester is a football club based in Portchester, a suburb of the town of Fareham, Hampshire, England. They are currently members of the Isthmian League South Central Division and play at the Wicor Recreation Ground.

== History ==
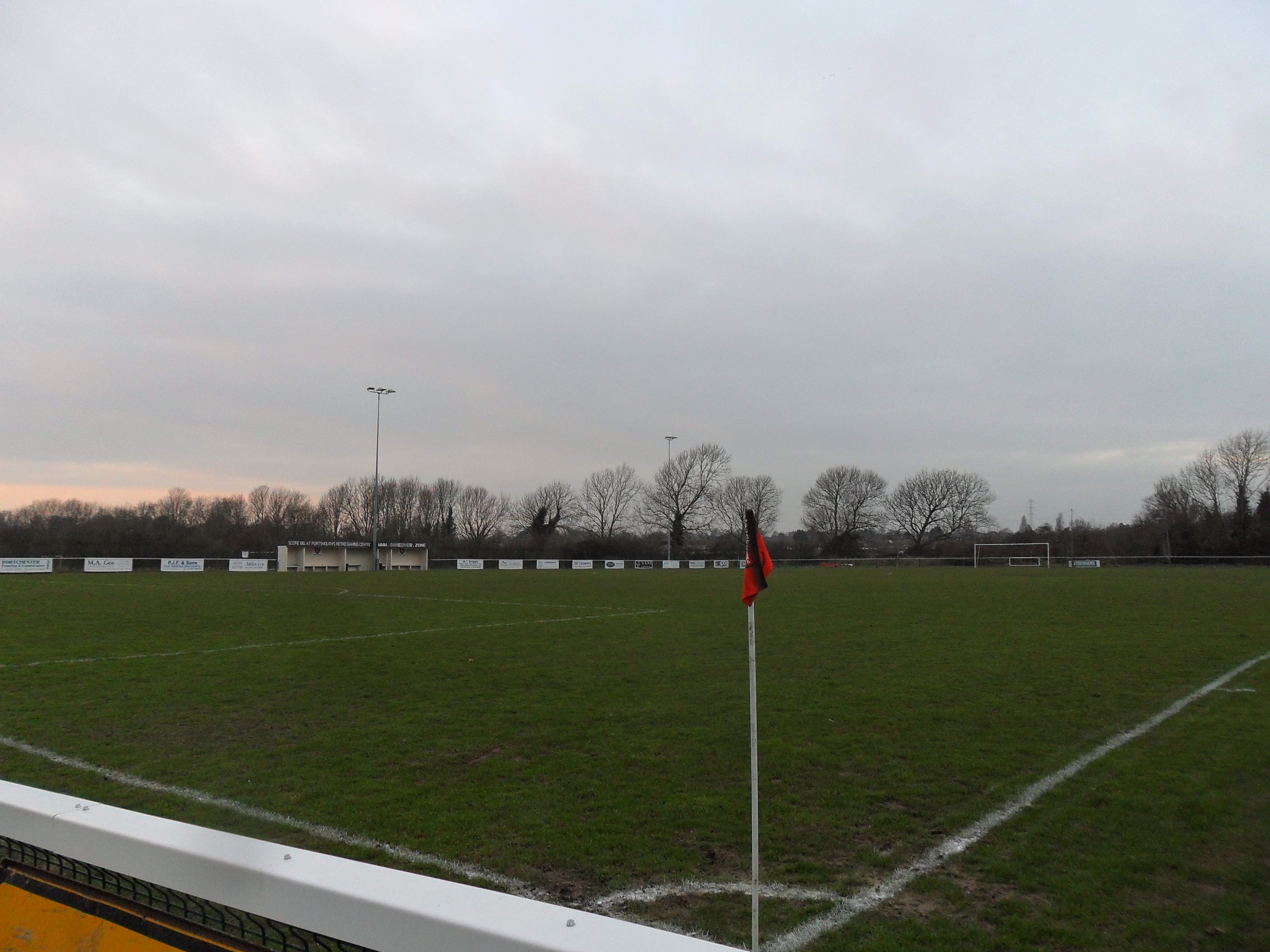
The Wicor Recreation Ground in 2018

The club was established in 1971 as Loyds Sports. They joined Division Six of the City of Portsmouth Sunday League. After amalgamating with Colourvision Rangers in 1973 they gained a place in Division Two. In 1976 the club became Wicor Mill, after which they joined the Portsmouth & District League. The club were runners-up in the Portsmouth & District League in 1997–98 and were promoted to Division Three of the Hampshire League; the following year they adopted their current name. Division Three was also renamed Division Two, and the club were runners-up in 1999–2000, earning promotion to Division One.

Portchester were Division One champions in 2001–02, but were unable to take promotion to the Wessex League due to a lack of floodlights. However, in 2004 they became founder members of the new Division Three of the Wessex League when the Hampshire League merged into it. Division Three was renamed Division Two in 2006, and the club were promoted to Division One after finishing fourth in 2006–07. In 2011–12 they were Division One runners-up, earning promotion to the Premier Division. In 2014–15 they won the Wessex League's League Cup. In 2023–24 the club finished fourth in the Premier Division, qualifying for the promotion play-offs, in which they lost 1–0 to Shaftesbury in the semi-finals. The season also saw them win the Hampshire Senior Cup for the first time, beating AFC Totton on penalties in the final. The following season saw the club win four competitions; they won the Portsmouth Senior Cup by beating Moneyfields on penalties in the final, the Russell Cotes Cup with a 3–1 win against AFC Stoneham, the League Cup with a 2–0 win over Hamble Club and the Wessex League Premier Division title, which resulted in promotion to the South Central Division of the Isthmian League.

== Honours ==
- Wessex League
  - Premier Division champions 2024–25
  - League Cup winners 2014–15, 2017–18, 2024–25
- Hampshire League
  - Division One champions 2001–02
- Russell Cotes Cup
  - Winners 2013–14, 2016–17, 2024–25
- Hampshire Senior Cup
  - Winners 2023–24
- Portsmouth Senior Cup
  - Winners 2024–25

== Records ==
- Best FA Cup performance: Second qualifying round, 2013–14, 2015–16, 2016–17, 2017–18, 2026–27
- Best FA Trophy performance: First round, 2025–26
- Best FA Vase performance: Third round, 2013–14, 2014–15
- Most goals in a season: 50 by Brett Pitman, 2022–23

== See also ==
- A.F.C. Portchester players
- A.F.C. Portchester managers
