= Hamworthy United F.C. =

Association football club in England

Coordinates: 50°42′54″N 2°00′05″W

Hamworthy United
- Full name: Hamworthy United Football Club
- Nickname: The Hammers
- Founded: 1970
- Ground: The County Ground, Hamworthy
- Capacity: 2,000
- Manager: Vacant
- League: Wessex League Division One
- 2025–26: Wessex League Division One, 9th of 22
- Website: www.hamworthyunited.co.uk
Home colours	Away colours

Hamworthy United Football Club is a football club based in Hamworthy, a suburb of Poole, England. Formed in 1970 as a merger of Hamworthy and Trinidad Old Boys, they are currently members of the Wessex League Division One and play at the County Ground. The club are affiliated to the Dorset FA.

== History ==
=== Pre-merger ===
Hamworthy Football Club was established in 1926, and were founder members of the Dorset Combination in 1957. Trinidad Old Boys joined the Dorset Combination in 1965.

=== Post-merger ===
The two clubs merged in 1970 to form Hamworthy United, continuing in the Dorset Combination and playing at Hamworthy's County Ground. They were Dorset Combination champions in 1976–77 and won the League Cup in 1989–90. In 2002 the league was renamed the Dorset Premier League, with Hamworthy going on to win the league in its first season under the new name. They retained the title the following season, also winning the league's Charity Shield, and were promoted to Division One of the Wessex League.

In their first season in the Wessex League, Hamworthy won the League Cup, defeating Thatcham Town in the final. They went on to win the Dorset Senior Cup the following season with a 2–1 win over Poole Town in the final. In 2006 Division One of the Wessex League was renamed the Premier Division. They reached the final of the League Cup in 2008–09 and the Dorset Senior Cup in 2013–14, but lost in both matches.

Hamworthy won the Wessex League Cup in 2020–21, beating United Services Portsmouth 3–1 in the final. The 2021–22 season saw the club win the Premier Division, earning promotion to Division One South of the Southern League. At the start of the 2022–23 season they won the inaugural Wessex League Charity Shield, defeating Shaftesbury 2–0. The club went on to finish third in Division One South, qualifying for the promotion play-offs. After beating Evesham United 3–0 in the semi-finals, they lost the final 2–0 to Sholing. In October 2023 the club withdrew from the Southern League, stating that they would focus on their reserve team in the Dorset Premier League.

== Ground ==
Hamworthy moved to the County Ground in 1950. A new grandstand was built in 1956 and opened by Stanley Rous. The ground became home to the new club after the 1970 merger. In 2023 the grandstand was condemned after failing safety checks.

== Honours ==
- Wessex League
  - Premier Division champions 2021–22
  - League Cup winners 2004–05, 2020–21
  - Charity Shield winners 2022–23
- Dorset Premier League
  - Champions 1976–77, 2002–03, 2003–04
  - League Cup winners 1989–90
  - Charity Shield winners 2003–04
- Dorset Senior Cup
  - Winners 2005–06

== Records ==
- Best FA Cup performance: Second qualifying round 2007–08, 2008–09, 2013–14, 2021–22
- Best FA Vase performance: Semi-finals, 2021–22

== See also ==
- Hamworthy United F.C. players
- Hamworthy United F.C. managers
