= Moneyfields F.C. =

Association football club in England

Coordinates: 50.8145°N 1.0607°W

Moneyfields
- Full name: Moneyfields Football Club
- Nickname: Moneys
- Founded: 1987
- Ground: John Jenkins Stadium, Portsmouth
- Chairman: Pete Seiden
- Manager: Neil Tomlinson
- League: Isthmian League South Central Division
- 2025–26: Isthmian League South Central Division, 4th of 22
Home colours	Away colours

Moneyfields Football Club is a football club based in Portsmouth, England. Affiliated to the Hampshire FA, they were founded in 1987 as Portsmouth Civil Service, before adopting their current name in 1994. The club are currently members of the Isthmian League South Central Division and play at the John Jenkins Stadium.

== History ==
The club was originally known as Portsmouth Civil Service and played in the Portsmouth Saturday League. In 1990–91 they won the Portsmouth Senior Cup and the Portsmouth Saturday League Premier Division, earning promotion to Division Three of the Hampshire League. The club retained the Portsmouth Senior Cup the following season, as well as winning the Hampshire Intermediate Cup and the Division Three title, resulting in promotion to Division Two. They retained the Hampshire Intermediate Cup and won Division Two in 1992–93, securing a third successive promotion, this time to Division One of the Hampshire League. In 1994 the club was renamed Moneyfields.

In 1996–97 Moneyfields were Division One champions. After finishing as runners-up the following season, the club were promoted to the Wessex League. They became members of Division One when the league merged with the Hampshire League in 2004, with Division One being renamed the Premier Division in 2005. The club won the Portsmouth Senior Cup again in 2012–13. In 2016–17 they were Premier Division runners-up and were promoted to Division One East of the Southern League after champions Portland United declined promotion.

After being moved into Division One South for the 2018–19 season, Moneyfields finished fourth in the division, qualifying for the promotion playoffs and won the Portsmouth Senior Cup. However, they were beaten by Yate Town in the semi-finals, losing 5–4 on penalties after a 1–1 draw. They retained the Portsmouth Senior Cup in 2019–20, although the final was not played until May 2021 due to the COVID-19 pandemic. In 2021 Moneyfields were voluntarily relegated back to the Premier Division of the Wessex League. The 2023–24 season saw the club win the Premier Division title, earning promotion to the South Central Division of the Isthmian League.

== Ground ==
The club played at Copnor Road until moving to the Moneyfields Sports Ground in 1994. Prior to 1994, Moneyfields Sports Ground was once the former training ground facility of Portsmouth, and was simply known as 'Moneyfields', due to its location in Moneyfield Avenue in Baffins, Portsmouth. The club relocated to Havant & Waterlooville's Westleigh Park for the 2022–23 season due to ground redevelopment work at the Moneyfields Sports Ground.

In 2024 the club returned to the redeveloped Moneyfields Sports Ground, which was renamed the John Jenkins Stadium after a D-Day veteran. The stadium's competitive attendance record was set on 3 January 2026 when a crowd of 753 attended an Isthmian League South Central Division match against AFC Portchester.

== Honours ==
- Wessex League
  - Premier Division champions 2023–24
- Hampshire League
  - Division One champions 1996–97
  - Division Two champions 1992–93
  - Division Three champions 1991–92
- Portsmouth Saturday League
  - Premier Division champions 1990–91
- Portsmouth Senior Cup
  - Winners 1990–91, 1991–92, 2012–13, 2018–19, 2019–20
- Hampshire Intermediate Cup
  - Winners 1991–92, 1992–93

== Records ==
- Best FA Cup performance: Third qualifying round, 2018–19
- Best FA Trophy performance: First round, 2020–21
- Best FA Vase performance: Fourth round, 2015–16
- Record attendance: 1,012 vs AFC Portchester, Wessex League Premier Division, 27 December 2022
- Biggest win: 11-1 vs Liss Athletic, Russell Cotes Cup Round 1, 27 October 2026
- Most goals in a season: Ryan Pennery, 37 (2023–24)

== See also ==
- Moneyfields F.C. players
