= Fleetlands F.C. =

Association football club in England

Coordinates: 50°50′01″N 1°10′16″W

Fleetlands
- Full name: Fleetlands Football Club
- Nickname: The Coptermen
- Founded: 1947
- Ground: Lederle Lane, Gosport
- Chairman: Iain Sellstrom
- Manager: Jason Mann
- League: Wessex League Premier Division
- 2025–26: Wessex League Division One, 1st of 22 (promoted)
Home colours

Fleetlands Football Club is a football club based in Gosport, Hampshire, England. They are members of the Wessex League Premier Division. The club is affiliated to the Hampshire Football Association and is an FA Charter Standard club.

== History ==
Fleetlands were formed in 1947 and joined the Hampshire League Division 3 East the following year and generally remained a steady mid-table outfit. In 1955 the league was re-structured with the East and West Divisions being merged into one, and in 1960 they won promotion as runners-up. After a couple of tough seasons, in 1963 they finished bottom of Division 2 and dropped out of county football. The club then played in the Portsmouth League and after some successful seasons they re-joined the Hampshire League Division Two in 1988. They were promoted to Division 1 after finishing runners-up in 1989–90. They were founder members of the Wessex League Division 3 in 2004–05, which, after two seasons, was renamed Division 2. In 2006–07, Fleetlands were crowned champions of Division 2, but the club left the league to become founder members of the Hampshire Premier League. The League and Cup double combination winning side of the 2012/13 season were promoted to the first team.

In 2020 the club launched its Youth & Development section which encourages kids of all ages up to under 18s.

In 2021 Fleetlands Women was relaunched after a long break.

Fleetlands Football Club is affiliated with the Sands United FC Solent, a unique football team supporting dads and other bereaved family members who have suffered the loss of a baby. They are made up solely of dads or family members who have directly been affected by the loss of a child through miscarriage, stillbirth or neo-natal death.

== Colours ==
The team plays in red and black striped shirts and black shorts.

== Ground ==
They play at Powder Monkey Park, DARA Fleetlands, Lederle Lane, Gosport, Hampshire. On the Portsmouth Harbour shoreline.

The floodlit stadium has two 100-capacity stands with standing facilities.

The only ground in the UK with a helipad and a golf course

== Honours ==
- Wessex League Division One
  - Champions 2025–26
- Wessex League Division Two
  - Champions 2006–07
- Hampshire League Division Two
  - Runners-up 1989–90
- Hampshire Premier League Senior Division
  - Runners-up 2016-17

== Records ==
- Best FA Cup performance: First qualifying round, 2026–27
- Best FA Vase performance: First round, 2024–25, 2026–27
