= Christchurch F.C. =

Association football club in England

Coordinates: 50.7728°N 1.8176°W

Christchurch
- Full name: Christchurch Football Club
- Nickname: The Priory
- Founded: 1885; 141 years ago
- Ground: Hurn Bridge Sports Ground, Christchurch
- Capacity: 1,200
- Chairman: Kamal Azzeddin
- Manager: Christer Warren
- League: Wessex League Premier Division
- 2024–25: Wessex League Premier Division, 10th of 20
Home colours	Away colours

Christchurch Football Club is a football club based in Christchurch, Dorset, England. They are currently members of the Wessex League Premier Division and play at the Hurn Bridge Sports Ground.

== History ==
The club was established in 1885. They won the Hampshire Junior Cup in 1892–93, and again in 1911–12. After winning the cup for a second time the club joined the West Division of the Hampshire League. They won the Junior Cup again in 1920–21, and after being moved to the Divisional Section in 1921–22, they returned to the West Division in 1922–23. Although they were runners-up behind Eastleigh Athletic in their first season back in the division, the club left the league after finishing bottom of the West Section in 1924–25. They subsequently played in the Bournemouth League.

Christchurch returned to the Hampshire League in 1935, joining Division Two. They were Division Two runners-up in their first two seasons, before winning the division in 1937–38, earning promotion to Division One. After the war the club were in Division Two, but were champions in 1947–48, resulting in promotion back to Division One. They were relegated after finishing bottom of Division One in 1949–50 and relegated again (to Division Three West) the following season having finished bottom of Division Two. In 1955 the club became members of Division Three amidst league reorganisation.

In 1956–57 Christchurch were Division Three champions and were promoted to Division Two. The 1959–60 season saw them finish as runners-up in Division Two, resulting in promotion to Division One. However, they were relegated back to Division One the following season, and in a repeat of the early 1950s, suffered a second successive relegation to Division Two in 1961–62. The club were Division Three runners-up in 1962–63, securing an immediate promotion back to Division Two. In 1968–69 they were Division Two runners-up and were promoted to Division One.

Christchurch were relegated back to Division Two at the end of the 1974–75 season, and then relegated to Division Three in 1976–77 after finishing bottom of Division Two. Despite only finishing fifth in 1979–80, they were promoted to Division Two. The 1985–86 season saw the club win Division Two, earning promotion to Division One. After winning the Hampshire Intermediate Cup and finishing fourth in the Hampshire League Premier Division in 1985–86, the club were admitted to the Wessex League. When the league gained a second division in 2004, the club became members of Division One, which was renamed the Premier Division the following year. They won the League Cup in 2011–12, but finished bottom of the Premier Division in 2014–15, resulting in relegation to Division One.

In 2017–18 Christchurch were Division One champions, earning promotion back to the Premier Division.

== Ground ==
The club played at the Barrack Road Recreation Ground until 1984, when they moved to their current Hurn Bridge ground. The site had previously been owned by British Aerospace and had been bought by Christchurch Borough Council. The ground also became the headquarters of the Bournemouth FA, as well as being used by Dorset County Cricket Club and Christchurch Cricket Club. A 200-seat stand was installed in 1995.

== Honours ==
- Wessex League
  - Division One champions 2017–18
  - League Cup winners 2011–12
- Hampshire League
  - Division Two champions 1937–38, 1947–48, 1985–86
  - Division Three champions 1952–53
- Hampshire Intermediate Cup
  - Winners 1986–87
- Hampshire Junior Cup
  - Winners 1892–93, 1911–12, 1920–21
- Bournemouth Senior Cup
  - Winners 1967–68, 1968–69, 1969–70
- Bournemouth Pickford Cup
  - Winners 1976–77

== Records ==
- Best FA Cup performance: Third qualifying round, 2020–21
- Best FA Vase performance: Fifth round, 2008–09

== See also ==
- Christchurch F.C. players
- Christchurch F.C. managers
