= Sherborne Town F.C. =

Association football club in England

Coordinates: 50°56′25″N 2°30′36″W

Sherborne Town
- Full name: Sherborne Town Football Club
- Nickname: The Zebras
- Founded: 1894
- Ground: Raleigh Grove, Sherborne
- Capacity: 1,150
- Chairman: John Bowers
- Manager: Neil Waddleton/Ben Wood
- League: Wessex League Premier Division
- 2025–26: Wessex League Premier Division, 8th of 20
- Website: http://www.sherbornetownfc.com/
Home colours	Away colours

Sherborne Town Football Club are a football club based in the town of Sherborne, Dorset, England. They are currently members of the Wessex League Premier Division and play at Raleigh Grove. The club is affiliated to the Dorset County Football Association and is an FA chartered Standard club.

== History ==
The club was founded in 1894 and played their matches at Marston Road. Just before the Second World War the club moved to the Terrace playing fields. The club then moved grounds again in 1985 to their present home of Raleigh Grove, referencing Sir Walter Raleigh's historical connection with the town.

In 1962, they joined the Dorset Combination. In the 1986–87 season the club entered the FA Vase for the first time and stayed in the competition until the end of the 1996–97 season, when their ground was deemed not fit for the competition as it had no floodlights. In the season 2003-4 the club had improved its facilities off the pitch, with floodlights and a 150-seater stand being installed. They also finished fourth in the league that season and won the Dorset Senior County Cup. An application was made to join the Western League but the Dorset Premier League refused to grant consent.

The 2005–06 campaign saw the club able to re-enter the FA Vase again. At the end of the season they finished second in the Dorset Premier Football League and this time gained promotion to the Western League Division One. After finishing 4th in 2006–07, they finished runners-up in 2007–08 – gaining promotion to the Western League Premier Division. That season also saw the club make its debut in the FA Cup, however it was very short-lived after a 4–1 loss away to Liskeard Athletic in the Extra Preliminary round.

The club remained in the Premier Division until the end of the 2011–12 season, when they finished second from bottom, forcing them to be relegated back to Western League Division One. The club bounced back up to the Premier Division at the first attempt in 2012-13 when they finished as Champions of Western League Division One.

== Ground ==
Sherborne Town play their home games at Raleigh Grove, Terrace Playing Fields, Sherborne, DT9 5NS.

The Raleigh Grove site was built on a grazing field with a pond in the far right corner of the ground. When the ground was built the club made sure it followed the regulations laid down for promotion from the Dorset Premier League at the time, meaning a covered section on the south west side of the ground was erected for supporters. The pitch also had four drains laid to aid the playing surface.

Planning permission was granted in 2003 for further work to be done to the ground and in 2004 hard standing, a grandstand, new dugouts and floodlights were all erected and working in just three months.

The record attendance at the ground is 1,000 versus Eastleigh (featuring ex-Southampton and England international Matthew Le Tissier), in the Andy Shephard Memorial match on 27 July 2003. Four Football League clubs have played at Raleigh Grove: Plymouth Argyle, Torquay United, Swindon Town and Yeovil Town.

== Current squad ==
Note: Flags indicate national team as defined under FIFA eligibility rules; some limited exceptions apply. Players may hold more than one non-FIFA nationality.

No.	Pos.	Nation	Player
—	GK	ENG	Liam Norris
—	GK	ENG	Josh Attwood
—	DF	ENG	Aaron White
—	DF	ENG	George Mapletoft
—	DF	ENG	Gary Bowles
—	DF	ENG	Josh Williams
—	DF	ENG	Tom Budden
—	DF	ENG	Aidan Skiverton
—	MF	ENG	Bradlee Shephard
—	MF	ENG	Callum Thompson

No.	Pos.	Nation	Player
—	MF	ENG	Jake Graziano
—	MF	ENG	Sam Farthing
—	MF	ENG	Billy Mullins
—	MF	ENG	Ben Wood
—	FW	ENG	Ollie Hebbard
—	FW	ENG	Alex Murphy
—	FW	ENG	Declan Cornish
—	FW	ENG	Anthony Herrin
—	FW	ENG	Josh Haskett
—	FW	ENG	Kieran Burpitt
—	FW	ENG	Jamar Collins

== Honours ==
=== League honours ===
- Western League Division One:
  - Champions (2): 2012–13, 2021–22
  - Runners-up (1): 2007–08
- Dorset Combination/Premier:
  - Champions (1): 1981–82
  - Runners-up (3): 1992–93, 2001–02, 2005–06

=== Cup honours ===
- Dorset Senior Cup:
  - Winners (2): 2003–04, 2007–08
  - Runners-up (1): 2006–07

== Club records ==
- Highest League Position: 9th in Western League Premier Division 2013–14, 9th in Wessex League Premier Division 2023-24
- FA Cup best performance: Second qualifying round 2010–11
- FA Vase best performance: Fourth round 2006–07
- Highest Attendance: 1,000 vs Eastleigh 27 July 2003

== Former players ==
1. Players that have played/managed in the football league or any foreign equivalent to this level (i.e. fully professional league).
2. Players with full international caps.

- (Wales) Chris Giles
