= Brockenhurst F.C. =

Association football club in England

Coordinates: 50°49′15″N 1°34′33″W

Brockenhurst
- Full name: Brockenhurst Football Club
- Nickname: The Badgers
- Founded: 1898
- Ground: Meadens Skoda Arena, Grigg Lane, Brockenhurst
- Capacity: 2,000 (200 seated)
- Chairman: Dave Wareham
- Manager: Steve Devlin
- League: Wessex League Premier Division
- 2025–26: Wessex League Premier Division, 9th of 20
Home colours	Away colours

Brockenhurst Football Club is a football club based in Brockenhurst, near Lymington, in Hampshire, England. They are currently members of the Wessex League Premier Division and play at Grigg Lane.

== History ==
The club was established in 1898. They became founder members of the New Forest League, and went on to win the league several times. After World War I the club played in the Bournemouth League, before joining the West Section of the Hampshire League in 1923. However, after finishing bottom of the West Section in 1925–26, they left the league, returning to the New Forest League. The club re-entered the Hampshire League in 1935, joining Division Two, but left after only two seasons, again dropping back into the New Forest League.

In 1947 Brockenhurst rejoined the Hampshire League for a second time. They were Division Three West runners-up in 1951–52 and became members of the new Division Three following league reorganisation in 1955. The club were Division Three champions in 1959–60, earning promotion to Division Two. After finishing as runners-up in Division Two in 1961–62, they were promoted to Division One. However, the club finished second-from-bottom of Division One in 1964–65 and were relegated back to Division Two.

Brockenhurst were Division Two champions in 1970–71, securing promotion to Division One. They went on to finish as runners-up in 1973–74 and were Hampshire League champions in 1975–76. The club were runners-up again in 1979–80. In 1986 they were founder members of the Wessex League, finishing last in the league's inaugural season. When the league gained a second division in 2004, Brockenhurst became members of Division One, which became the Premier Division in 2006.

After finishing bottom of the Premier Division in 2010–11, Brockenhurst were relegated to Division One. However, they were Division One champions in 2012–13, earning promotion back to the Premier Division. In October 2013 the club were involved in a Hampshire Senior Cup tie against Andover Town which ended 0–0 after extra time. The subsequent penalty shootout resulted in 29 consecutive goals being scored, with Brockenhurst winning 15–14, a result later confirmed by the Football Association as an English record (and possibly a world record) for the highest number of consecutive goals scored in a penalty shootout.

In 2019–20 Brockenhurst won the Bournemouth Senior Cup, winning 5–4 on penalties against Hamworthy United after a 2–2 draw. The following season saw them win the Hampshire Senior Invitation Plate. In 2021–22 the club won the Russell Cotes Cup, defeating Hamble Club 5–3 on penalties after a 4–4 draw.

== Ground ==
The club initially played at a ground near Rhinefield Ornamental Drive before moving to a ground on Lymington Road between the Snakecatcher and Rose & Crown pubs before World War I. After the war they relocated to Fathersfield, where they played until moving to Black Knoll in 1931 after the Fathersfield site was needed for housing. In 1937 the club relocated again, this time to Oberfield. Following World War II they played at Tile Barn, until moving to Grigg Lane in 1951.

The Grigg Lane site had been bought from the Morant Estate in 1950, and dressing rooms and a small stand were initially built. A social club was added in 1972, with floodlights erected in the same year. In 1978 a new 200-seat elevated stand was built, with changing rooms located underneath.

== Honours ==
- Wessex League
  - Division One champions 2012–13
- Hampshire League
  - Division One champions 1975–76
  - Division Two champions 1970–71
  - Division Three champions 1959–60
- Bournemouth Senior Cup
  - Winners 1960–61, 2019–20
- Hampshire Senior Invitation Plate
  - Winners 2020–21
- Russell Cotes Cup
  - Winners 2021–22
- Hants Intermediate Cup
  - Winners 1961–62

== Records ==
- Best FA Cup performance: Third qualifying round, 1992–93, 2001–02, 2004–05, 2015–16
- Best FA Vase performance: Fifth round, 1974–75, 2021–22
- Record attendance: 1,104 vs St Albans City

== See also ==
- Brockenhurst F.C. players
- Brockenhurst F.C. managers
