= Petersfield Town F.C. =

Association football club in England

Coordinates: 51°00′26″N 0°55′39″W

Petersfield Town
- Full name: Petersfield Town Football Club
- Nickname: The Rams
- Founded: 1993
- Ground: The Smartspaces®️ Stadium, Love Lane, Petersfield.
- Capacity: 3,000
- Chairman: Nick Orr
- Manager: Vacant
- League: Wessex League Premier Division
- 2025–26: Wessex League Premier Division, 11th of 20
- Website: https://www.petersfieldtownfc.co.uk/
Home colours	Away colours

Petersfield Town Football Club are an English football club based in Petersfield, Hampshire, England. The club is affiliated to the Hampshire Football Association, and is an England Football Accredited Club. They are currently members of the Wessex League Premier Division, playing home fixtures at The Southdowns Builders Stadium.

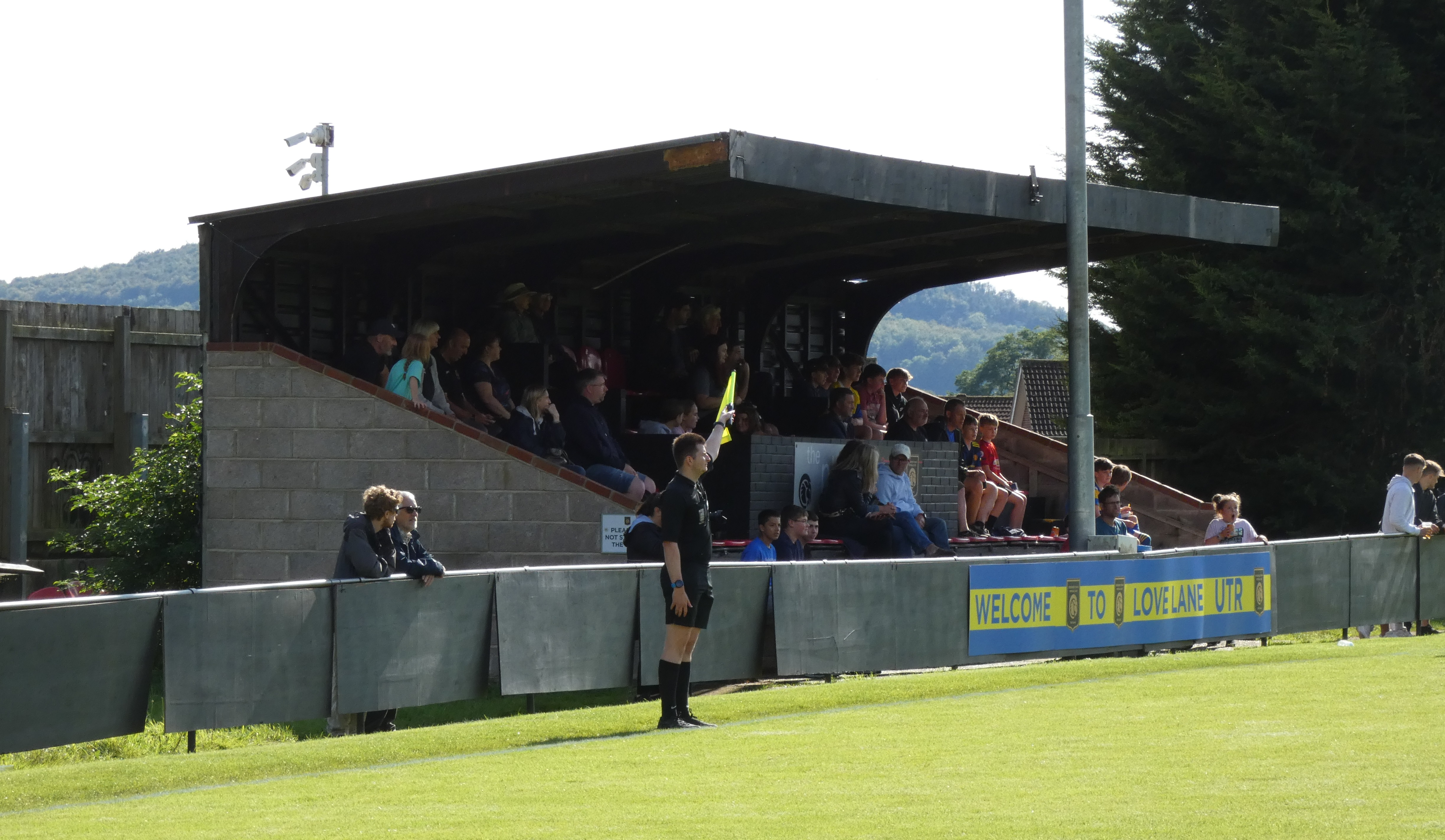
Smartspaces Stadium - Love Lane

== History ==
The club was founded by Peter De-Sisto in 1993 after the demise of Petersfield United (founded 1889). The previous club folded after being denied permission to switch from the Isthmian League to the Wessex League and had serious debts. The newly formed club took their place in Division One (now Premier Division) of the Wessex League, under the management of former England player Gary Stevens.

For the first four seasons the club stayed in the Wessex League before being relegated to Division One of the Hampshire League. The club only lasted one season in Division One and were relegated again to Division Two, where they stayed for a further season finishing as runners-up, however when the league was re-organised they were effectively promoted twice, as they now found themselves in the newly formed Premier Division.

The club stayed in the Premier Division of the Hampshire League until the start of the 2004/05 season, when the Wessex League expanded and the club joined the newly formed Division Two. The club remained in this Division - which was now called Division One, until the 2013/14 season when Petersfield Town became Wessex League Division One Champions.

Under the stewardship of Ian Saunders, the club won the Wessex League Premier Division in 2014/15, becoming the first club to win back to back championships in the Wessex League and thus earned promotion to the Southern Football League.

Numerous 'Team of the Month' awards were claimed during the campaign, with midfielder Ed Dryden catching the eye, earning a move to Stoke City.

Season 2015/16 was another year of firsts for Petersfield – it was the first time they had played in the Southern League and they went on to finish in 13th place in Division One Central.

They played in the FA Trophy for the first time too and had their best ever run in the FA Cup to date – reaching the third qualifying round before losing to National League South side St Albans City.

Saunders left the Rams a little over a week before the start of the 2016/17 campaign and Andy Neal and Gary Lines had short spells in charge of first team matters before John Robson was appointed manager in October 2016.

However, he could not reverse what had become a disastrous season and the Rams finished bottom of Division One Central, gaining only nine points all season.

It wasn't all doom and gloom though – the first team reached the final of the Portsmouth Senior Cup at Fratton Park, home of Portsmouth FC, and the reserve team won the Wyvern League's Division One East title and the Wyvern League Challenge Cup.

In the summer of 2017, Jim Macey was appointed first team manager and the Rams were placed back in the Wessex Premier Division following their relegation from Step 4 football. After a poor start to the campaign Macey resigned and Mark Summerhill took the helm. He worked tirelessly but could not turn around the season, and the club finished bottom of the Premier Division for a second successive relegation.

Back in Wessex Division One, the goal in 2018/19 was to stabilise the club both on and off the field, and this was achieved as Summerhill took the team to a 15th-place finish on 40 points, plus a quarter-final appearance in the Russell-Cotes Cup.

Further progress was made in 2019/20 with the team on course for a top half of the table finish when the season was terminated due to COVID-19.

There was also cup success, the highlights being the club's best ever run in the FA Vase reaching the second round proper, and the third round of the Hampshire Senior Cup.

The pandemic once again brought season 2020/21 to a premature end, however the club was once again enjoying a solid campaign.

After the two curtailed seasons the club concluded 2021/22 in twelfth place.

A partnership with Gosport Borough saw Pat Suraci and Joe Lea join as Joint Managers, with Mark Summerhill becoming Head of Football.

They brought instant success to the club with promotion back to the Wessex Premier Division via the Division One play-offs defeating New Milton Town, while also reaching the Wessex League Cup final.

Their tenure was unfortunately short-lived with the trio departing for Privett Park in the summer of 2023, however it gave opportunity for captain, Connor Hoare to step into the Manager's role for 2023/24, assisted by Callum Glen.

Their appointment coincided with a new era at Love Lane, following a summer merger with the successful Petersfield Town Juniors.

Together, they formed a single unified club aimed at improving the long-term development of football in Petersfield. This included the creation of player pathways across all age groups, the establishment of a women’s team, and an increase in volunteer involvement to support the club’s off-field operations.

The Juniors royal blue and yellow were adopted as the club's new home kit colours, with the traditional red and black remaining as the change strip.

2024/25 saw the club moved laterally by the FA into the Southern Combination Football League Premier Division and new adventures in facing Sussex-based opposition. It was also a prosperous season, as The Rams finished in fifth spot to make the play-offs, beaten by Crowborough Athletic who would go on to gain promotion.

However, it was to be a short hiatus across the county border, as the club were re-allocated back to the Wessex League for the start of 2025/26, this time with Connor Hoare taking sole managerial responsibility following Callum Glen's move to Moneyfields.

Hoare departed midway through the 2025/26 campaign having taken the side to the summit of the Wessex League Premier Division table, taking charge at Midhurst & Easebourne United. Director of Football, Kris Stephens assumed interim control - delivering the Portsmouth Senior Cup with the majority of an U23's side against strong AFC Portchester opposition, on a momentous occasion for the club.

Former Ram, Zak Sharp, was named new permanent boss in May 2026, following a successful period as Gosport Borough Under 18's manager.

== Ground ==
The club play their home games at The Smartspaces®️ Stadium, Love Lane, Petersfield, Hampshire, GU31 4BW.

The stadium has hosted Petersfield Town and previously Petersfield United since 1948. Prior to this the club played at Princes Road on land subsequently owned by Hampshire Cattle Breeders.

A latter-day attendance record of 1,615 was set on 28 December 1992, for an Isthmian League Division Three fixture with Aldershot Town. The visitors recording a 3–0 victory in what was to be The Rams last season under their former guise as Petersfield United. The stadium is situated opposite Churcher's College.

== Management Team ==
- 1st Team Manager – Zak Sharp
- 1st Team Assistant Manager – Ryan Lemmon
- 1st Team Coach - Jack Davies
- 1st Team Strength & Conditioning Coach - Ronnie Aird
- 1st Team Analyst/ Coach - Aiden Smith
- 1st Team Goalkeeper Coach – Matt Whittle
- 1st Team Physiotherapist - Hannah Meaden
- 1st Team Kit Man – Tony Clark
- Under 23 Team Manager – Aaron Ramsey
- Under 23 Assistant Manager – Steven Matile
- Under 18 Team Manager – Martin Parfitt
- Under 18 Assistant Manager – Trevor Smith
- Under 18 Coach - Riley Garrett
- Women's First Team Manager - Ashley Fooks

== Key Contacts ==
- Honorary President - Dave Ayre
- Chairman – Nick Orr
- Vice Chairman – Vacant
- Adult Secretary - Mark Nicoll
- Youth Secretary – David Wands
- Treasurer – Jimmy Balogun
- Director of Football – Kris Stephens
- Accreditation Officer – Nigel Gardner
- Membership Secretary – Ben Bentley
- Media Officer – Dean Tricker
- Assistant Media Officer - Robyn Lewer
- Youth Development Officer – Mark Garrett
- Youth Operations Officer – Keiran Earl
- Head of Grounds – Michael Ferguson

== Notable managers & players who have joined professional clubs ==
- Maik Taylor (Barnet, Southampton, Fulham, Birmingham City, Millwall and Northern Ireland International)
- Gary Stevens Manager 1993 (Brighton, Tottenham, Portsmouth and England International)
- Guy Madjo (Bristol City, Crawley Town, Shewsbury Town, Aldershot Town)

== Honours ==
=== League honours ===
- Wessex League Premier Division
  - Champions (1): 2014–15
- Wessex League Division One
  - Champions (1): 2013–14
  - Play-Off Winners (1): 2022–23
- Hampshire League Division Two
  - Champions (1): 1981-82
  - Runners-up (1): 1998–99
- Hampshire League Division Three ( East)
  - Runners-up (1): 1971-72
- Hampshire League Division Four
  - Champions (1): 1977-78
- Porstmouth Senior League Division One
  - Champions (1): 1958-59

=== Cup honours ===
- Wessex League Cup
  - Runners-up (3): 2014, 2015, 2023
- Portsmouth Senior Cup
  - Winners (2): 1978, 2026
  - Runners-up (3): 1977, 2015, 2017
- Aldershot Senior Cup
  - Winners (2): 1979, 1983
  - Runners-up (1): 1980
- Hampshire Youth Cup
  - Winners: 1994

== Records ==
- FA Cup: Third Qualifying Round 2015–16
- FA Trophy: Preliminary Qualifying Round 2015–16, 2016–17
- FA Vase: Second Round 1994–95, 2019–20
- Highest League Finish: Southern League Division 1 central (Step 4) - 13th Position, 2015–16
- Largest Winning Margin: 14-0 vs Andover New Street, 2013–14
- Largest recorded home attendance: 1,615 vs Aldershot Town on 28 December 1992
- Most Appearances: 214, Will Essai and Luke Bishop (Statistics only date back to 2005)
- Top Goalscorer: 68, Callum Coker (Statistics only date back to 2005)
- Highest Goals in One season: 40, Robert Tambling 2013-14
