= Shaftesbury F.C. =

Coordinates: 51°00′23″N 2°11′23″W

Shaftesbury
- Full name: Shaftesbury Town Football Club
- Nickname: Shaftesbury Rockies
- Founded: 1888
- Ground: Cockrams
- Capacity: 2,500
- Vice Chairman: Nick Crane
- Chairman: Steve Coffen
- Manager: Josh Staunton
- League: Southern League Division One South
- 2025–26: Southern League Division One South, 5th of 22
Home colours	Away colours

Shaftesbury Football Club are a football club based in Shaftesbury, Dorset, England. The club is affiliated to the Dorset County Football Association and is a FA chartered Standard club. They are currently members of the Southern League Division One South.

== History ==
The club was established in 1888 and by the 1905–06 season were winners of the Dorset Junior League. The club became members of the Dorset Senior League for the start of the 1931–32 campaign and a season later were winners of the competition.

After the Second World War, the club played in the FA Cup for the first time, reaching the Extra Preliminary Qualifying round before being knocked out by Alton Town. The club became one of the founder members of the Dorset Football Combination League at the start of the 1957–58 season. Four seasons later the club reached the final of the Dorset Senior Cup, for the first time but lost out to Dorchester Town. The club continued in the Combination until the end of the 1961–62 competition, when they dropped into the Dorset leagues again.

The 1976–77 season saw the club return to the Dorset Combination league. The club went on to win the combination league in the 1988–89 competition. They repeated another title success again in the 1996–97 campaign.

When the Wessex Football League expanded for the start of the 2004–05 campaign, the club moved to the newly created Division Two. The next season saw the club enter the FA Vase for the first time, where they were knocked out in the First Qualification round by Westbury United. The club stayed in the Wessex League a further season, when they finished bottom of the league and were relegated to the Dorset Premier Football League. In 2013–14, Shaftesbury Town continued their Dorset Premier League challenge, starting on 10 August against Wareham Rangers.

The 2023–24 season saw Shaftesbury promoted from the Wessex Premier Division, defeating AFC Stoneham 1–0 in the play-off final.

== Ground ==
Shaftesbury play their home games at Cockrams, Coppice Street, Shaftesbury, SP7 8PF. But, when the council refused to give planning permission, the club called upon the local sponsor and supermarket, Tesco. Tesco built the club a new playground and a huge sheltered stand which is estimated to have around 2–300 persons capacity.

The club have played at Cockrams since moving there in 1974. The ground belongs to the local Shaftesbury council who lease the ground to the club.

== Honours ==
=== League honours ===
- Wessex League Premier Division
  - Playoff winners (1): 2023–24
- Dorset Football Combination League :
  - Winners (2): 1988–89, 1996–97
- Dorset Senior League :
  - Winners (1): 1932–33
- Dorset Junior League :
  - Winners (2): 1905–06, 1962–63

=== Cup honours ===
- Dorset Senior Cup:
  - Runners-Up (3): 1960–61, 2017–18, 2023–24
- Dorset Football Combination League Challenge Cup :
  - Winners (2): 1988–89, 1994–95
  - Runners-Up (1): 1987–88
- Dorset Junior League Cup :
  - Winners (3): 1899–1900, 1905–06, 1975–76
  - Runners-Up (1): 1896–97
- Dorset Junior Cup :
  - Winners (1): 1907–08

== Records ==
- Highest League Position: 3rd Wessex Premier League 2021–22
- FA Cup best performance: Second qualifying round, 2021–22, 2025–26 (replay)
- FA Trophy best performance: Third qualifying round, 2025–26
- FA Vase best performance: Second round, 2022–23

== Former players ==
1. Players that have played/managed in the football league or any foreign equivalent to this level (i.e. fully professional league).
2. Players with full international caps.
- (England) Steven Thompson

== Former coaches ==
1. Managers/Coaches that have played/managed in the football league or any foreign equivalent to this level (i.e. fully professional league).
2. Managers/Coaches with full international caps.
- (England) Stuart Housley
- (Wales) Ken Wookey
