= Dorset Premier Football League =

Association football league in England

Dorset Premier League
- Founded: 1957
- Country: England
- Divisions: 1
- Number of clubs: 16
- Level on pyramid: Level 11
- Promotion to: Wessex League Division One; Western League Division One; South West Peninsula League Division One
- Relegation to: Dorset Football League
- Current champions: Blandford United (2025–26)
- Most championships: Parley Sports (12 times)
- Website: Dorset Premier League

The Dorset Premier Football League is a football league based in Dorset, England, which sits at Step 7 of the National League System, or level 11 of the overall English football league system.

== History ==
The league was formed in 1957 under the name Dorset Football Combination League when a number of senior clubs within the county became disillusioned at being dictated to by junior and minor clubs.

The objective of the league on its formation was to increase the standard of football and competition throughout Dorset and neighbouring counties, an ideal that still holds today.

In 1991 the Dorset Football Combination League accepted an invitation to become a feeder to the Wessex League, thus giving its member clubs the opportunity to progress through the National League System. The league has now been placed at the Regional Feeder League level of the National League System, standing parallel to the Hampshire Premier League. Clubs promoted from the DPL usually join the 2nd level of the Wessex League. However, the conclusion of the 2005–06 season saw Sherborne Town move to the Western League Division One. Bridport, who maintain a reserve team in the DPL, also play in the Western League. The bottom club may be relegated to the Dorset Senior League, which is a level 12 league of the English football pyramid.

The 2002–03 season saw the League change its name to the Dorset Premier Football League. It was felt that this more reflected the League's status. In 2010 the League was awarded the FA Charter Standard status, only the third league in the FA’s jurisdiction to be so awarded.

== League champions ==
Season	Champions
1957-58	Swanage Town
1958-59	15th Training Battalion RASC
1959-60	Swanage Town
1960-61	Swanage Town
1961-62	Swanage Town
1962-63	Parley Sports
1963-64	Parley Sports
1964-65	Parley Sports
1965-66	Parley Sports
1966-67	Parley Sports
1967-68	Weymouth Reserves
1968-69	Weymouth Reserves
1969-70	Blandford United
1970-71	Portland United
1971-72	Parley Sports
1972-73	Parley Sports
1973-74	Parley Sports
1974-75	Blandford United
1975-76	Parley Sports
1976-77	Hamworthy United
1977-78	Flight Refuelling
1978-79	Poole Town Reserves
1979-80	Parley Sports
1980-81	Dorchester Town Reserves
1981-82	Sherborne Town
1982-83	Blandford United
1983-84	Parley Sports
1984-85	Parley Sports
1985-86	Bridport
1986-87	Bridport
1987-88	Bridport
1988-89	Shaftesbury
1989-90	Weymouth Reserves
1990-91	Dorchester Town Reserves
1991-92	Blandford United
1992-93	Westland Sports
1993-94	Hamworthy Engineering
1994-95	Hamworthy Engineering
1995-96	Hamworthy Engineering
1996-97	Shaftesbury Town
1997-98	Sturminster Marshall
1998–99	Portland United
1999–2000	Portland United
2000–01	Hamworthy Recreation
2001–02	Hamworthy Recreation
2002–03	Hamworthy United
2003–04	Hamworthy United
2004–05	Hamworthy Recreation
2005–06	Holt United
2006–07	Westland Sports
2007–08	Portland United
2008–09	Portland United
2009–10	Hamworthy Recreation
2010–11	Hamworthy Recreation
2011–12	Westland Sports
2012–13	Portland United
2013–14	Portland United
2014–15	Hamworthy Recreation
2015–16	Shaftesbury Town
2016–17	Holt United
2017–18	Hamworthy Recreation
2018–19	Hamworthy Recreation
2019–20	No Competition as a result of COVID-19 pandemic
2020–21	No Competition as a result of COVID-19 pandemic
2021–22	Hamworthy Recreation
2022–23	Holt United
2023–24	Sturminster Newton United
2024–25	Bournemouth Sports
2025-26	Blandford United

== Member clubs (2026–27) ==
- Balti Sports
- Bournemouth Electric
- Bournemouth Sports
- Bridport Reserves
- Cobham Sports
- Dorchester Sports
- Gillingham Town
- Hamworthy Recreation Reserves
- Hamworthy United Reserves
- Holt United
- Mere Town
- Portland United Reserves
- Sherborne Town Reserves
- Swanage Town & Herston
- Verwood Town
- Wareham Rangers
- Westland Sports
- Wimborne Town Reserves

== Locations 2025–26 ==
Dorset Premier Football League (Dorset)
