= Dorset County Football Association =

Area sporting organization with 19th century origins

The Dorset County Football Association is the County Football Association for Dorset. The Dorset County FA traces its root back to the South Hants and Dorset Football Association which was founded in 1884. Three years later in 1887, due to the growth of football in the area, the South Hants and Dorset FA split into the Dorset County Football Association and the Hampshire Football Association. They run a number of cups for member clubs of all levels across the county.

== Affiliated Leagues ==
Affiliated leagues include:

- Blackmore Vale League
- Dorset Ability Counts League
- Dorset Flexi League
- Dorset Mini Soccer League
- Dorset Youth League
- Dorset Walking Football League
- Dorset Premier League
- Weymouth Sunday League
- Dorset Girls League
- Dorset League
- Dorset Women's League

== County Cups ==
=== Adult County Cups ===
- Dorset Senior Cup
- Dorset Women's Cup
- Dorset Senior Trophy
- Dorset Junior Cup
- Dorset Intermediate Cup
- Dorset Minor Cup
- Dorset Sunday Challenge Cup
- Dorset Sunday Challenge Plate
- Dorset U18 Youth Cup

=== Youth County Cups ===
- Dorset U16 Youth Cup
- Dorset U15 Youth Cup
- Dorset U14 Youth Cup
- Dorset U13 Youth Cup
- Dorset U12 Youth Cup
- Dorset U11 Youth Cup
- Dorset U10 Youth Cup
- Dorset U17 Girl's Youth Cup
- Dorset U15 Girl's Youth Cup
- Dorset U13 Girl's Youth Cup
