= A.F.C. Netley =

English football club

- Full name: A.F.C. Netley
- Founded: 1901
- Ground: Romsey Town F.C.
- Chairman: Jay Morgan
- Manager: Matt Gover
- League: Hampshire Premier League Senior Division
Home colours	Away colours

A.F.C. Netley are a long-running amateur football club based in Netley, Southampton, Hampshire.

They are affiliated with the Hampshire Football Association and are currently members of the Hampshire Premier League Senior Division (Level 11, Step 7 on the English football pyramid system), whilst the reserves play in the Hampshire Combination & Development League.

Formerly known as Netley Central Sports, they were long-standing members of the original Hampshire League Division 1, which prior to the creation of the Wessex League was equivalent to the modern-day Step 6.

== History ==
The club were established in 1901 as Netley Sports and originally played friendly matches before becoming founder members of the Southampton League in 1908.

Netley enjoyed great success during the fifties, most notably winning the Southampton Senior Cup three years running, along with the Hampshire Intermediate Cup twice.

In 1957, Netley began their long association with the Hampshire League and back-to-back title wins saw them quickly reach Division 1. At the time, this level was of a very high standard, and in 1965 they finished in 4th place for what was their highest position. Netley were also regular entrants in the national FA Amateur Cup and the Hampshire Senior Cup, enjoying several good runs in both competitions. Their playing strength was further illustrated when the reserves were also elected to the county league.

The club became known as Netley Central Sports in 1970 - showing the link with the local Sports & Social Club. Apart from a couple of brief spells, they remained top-flight regulars for many years until the late nineties, when a decline in fortunes resulted in successive relegation's down to the basement division.

In 2004, the original Hampshire League was absorbed into the expanding Wessex League, with Netley joining the short-lived third division, but unable to meet the strict ground criteria, they left two years later to join the Hampshire League 2004, where they twice won the league and cup double.

It was the end of an era in 2011 when Netley dropped out of county soccer, but after a successful spell of rebuilding in the Southampton League, they returned to the competition in 2014, which had since become Division 1 of the Hampshire Premier League.

In 2020, the club was re-branded as AFC Netley and in 2026 they won the Division 1 title.

== Honours ==
=== 1st Team ===
- Hampshire Football Association
  - Intermediate Cup Winners 1953/54 and 1957/58. Finalists 2012/13
- Hampshire League
  - Division 2 Champions 1958/59 and 1972/73
  - Division 3 Champions 1957/58
- Hampshire Premier League
  - Division 1 Champions 2017/18 and 2025/26
- Hampshire League 2004
  - League Champions 2008/09 and 2009/10
  - Trophyman League Cup Winners 2008/09 and 2009/10
- Southampton Football Association
  - Senior Cup Winners 1955/56, 1956/57, 1957/58, 1971/72, 1972/73 and 1998/99. Finalists 1964/65, 1967/68 and 1989/90
- Southampton League
  - Premier Division Runners-up 2012/13
  - Senior Division 1 Champions 1923/24, 1954/55, 1955/56 and 2011/12
  - Senior Division 2 Champions 1953/54
- Other
  - Eastleigh Bi-Centennial Trophy Winners 1987, 1988, 1989, 1990 and 1993

=== 2nd Team ===
- Hampshire League
  - Division 3 Champions 1966/67
- Southampton Football Association
  - Senior Cup Finalists 1970/71
  - Junior 'A' Cup Finalists 1954/55
  - Junior 'B' Cup Winners 1935/36
- Southampton League
  - Premier Division Champions 1964/65 and 1965/66
  - Senior Division 1 Champions 2010/11
  - Junior Division 1 Champions 1954/55
  - Junior Division 2 Champions 1950/51
  - Junior East Division Champions 1932/33, 1948/49 and 1950/51
  - Senior League Cup Winners 2010/11

== Playing Records ==
=== League ===
Season	Division	Position	Significant events
1908-57	Southampton League	-	
1957/58	Hampshire League Division 3	1/16	Promoted
1958/59	Hampshire League Division 2	1/16	Promoted
1959/60	Hampshire League Division 1	11/14	
1960/61	Hampshire League Division 1	14/16	
1961/62	Hampshire League Division 1	12/16	
1962/63	Hampshire League Division 1	10/16	
1963/64	Hampshire League Division 1	7/16	
1964/65	Hampshire League Division 1	4/16	Highest ever placing
1965/66	Hampshire League Division 1	6/16	
1966/67	Hampshire League Division 1	8/16	
1967/68	Hampshire League Division 1	9/16	
1968/69	Hampshire League Division 1	7/16	
1969/70	Hampshire League Division 1	15/16	Relegated
1970/71	Hampshire League Division 2	11/16	
1971/72	Hampshire League Division 2	8/16	
1972/73	Hampshire League Division 2	1/16	Champions
1973/74	Hampshire League Division 1	12/16	
1974/75	Hampshire League Division 1	9/16	
1975/76	Hampshire League Division 1	8/16	
1976/77	Hampshire League Division 1	10/16	
1977/78	Hampshire League Division 1	9/16	
1978/79	Hampshire League Division 1	11/16	
1979/80	Hampshire League Division 1	6/16	
1980/81	Hampshire League Division 1	18/20	
1981/82	Hampshire League Division 1	15/20	
1982/83	Hampshire League Division 1	18/20	
1983/84	Hampshire League Division 1	11/20	
1984/85	Hampshire League Division 1	18/20	
1985/86	Hampshire League Division 1	18/20	
1986/87	Hampshire League Division 1	5/18	Wessex League formed
1987/88	Hampshire League Division 1	9/18	
1988/89	Hampshire League Division 1	10/17	
1989/90	Hampshire League Division 1	3/18	
1990/91	Hampshire League Division 1	17/18	Relegated
1991/92	Hampshire League Division 2	12/15	
1992/93	Hampshire League Division 2	5/18	Promoted
1993/94	Hampshire League Division 1	18/20	
1994/95	Hampshire League Division 1	13/20	
1995/96	Hampshire League Division 1	2/20	
1996/97	Hampshire League Division 1	7/21	
1997/98	Hampshire League Division 1	20/20	Relegated
1998/99	Hampshire League Division 2	18/18	Relegated
1999/00	Hampshire League Division 2	11/14	Re-organisation
2000/01	Hampshire League Division 2	10/16	
2001/02	Hampshire League Division 2	5/18	
2002/03	Hampshire League Division 2	5/13	
2003/04	Hampshire League Division 2	4/15	Competition absorbed by Wessex League
2004/05	Wessex League Division 3	12/22	
2005/06	Wessex League Division 3	5/17	Left competition
2006/07	Hampshire League 2004	2/16	
2007/08	Hampshire League 2004	2/15	
2008/09	Hampshire League 2004	1/15	
2009/10	Hampshire League 2004	1/14	
2010/11	Hampshire League 2004	8/17	Left competition
2011-14	Southampton League		
2014/15	Hampshire Premier League Division 1	2/11	
2015/16	Hampshire Premier League Division 1	6/11	
2016/17	Hampshire Premier League Division 1	4/9	
2017/18	Hampshire Premier League Division 1	1/8	Champions but not promoted
2018/19	Hampshire Premier League Division 1	3/8	
2019/20	Hampshire Premier League Division 1		abandoned due to Covid-19
2020/21	Hampshire Premier League Division 1		abandoned due to Covid-19
2021/22	Hampshire Premier League South Div	10/10	Re-elected
2022/23	Hampshire Premier League Division 1	6/13	
2023/24	Hampshire Premier League Division 1	6/13	
2024/25	Hampshire Premier League Division 1	7/14	
2025/26	Hampshire Premier League Division 1	1/14	Promoted
2026/27	Hampshire Premier League Senior Div	-	

=== FA Amateur Cup ===
Season	Round	Opponents	Result
1959/60	Preliminary Round	A v Fareham Town	D 2–2
	Replay	H v Fareham Town	L 0–1
1960/61	Preliminary Round	A v Ryde Sports	W 1–0
	1st Qualifying Round	A v Gosport Borough	W 2–0
	2nd Qualifying Round	A v Hamworthy	W 3–2
	3rd Qualifying Round	A v Fareham Town	L 0–2
1961/62	Preliminary Round	A v Gosport Borough	L 0–2
1962/63	Preliminary Round	A v Waterlooville	L 2–3
1963/64	Preliminary Round	A v Ryde Sports	L 0–1
1964/65	1st Qualifying Round	A v Winchester City	L 4–5
1965/66	Preliminary Round	A v Ryde Sports	W 5–1
	1st Qualifying Round	A v Sholing Sports	W 2–1
	2nd Qualifying Round	A v Brockenhurst	L 3–4
1966/67	Preliminary Round	H v Swaythling Athletic	W -
	1st Qualifying Round	A v Hamworthy	W 3–2
	2nd Qualifying Round	A v Gosport Borough	L 0–2

== Ground ==
At the start of the 2025–26 season the club agreed a groundshare with Romsey Town to use the By-pass Ground for all their first team home fixtures. Despite the sixteen mile distance, the better facilities would enable the club to progress.

Traditionally, AFC Netley played their home games at Station Road Recreation Ground, Netley Abbey, Southampton, SO31 5HY. They still use the venue for reserve team fixtures, it has one enclosed pitch with an adjacent pavilion and plenty of car parking.

== Notable players ==
A number of former Southampton players have also turned out for Netley; these include Manny Andruszewski, Mick Earls, Tommy Hare, John Hollowbread, and Bill Beaney, who was also manager for a spell. For the 1989–90 campaign they were coached by David Armstrong.

More recently, the locally born Danny Ings, who briefly played for Netley before joining Southampton. He later transitioned to professional football. His father, Shayne, also played for the club, initially as a winger before switching to full-back.

Former player Bob Crompton gave over 60 years service to the club and went on to hold positions with both the Southampton Football Association and the Hampshire League 2004.

== Local rivalries ==
There a vast number of clubs from the east side of Southampton and AFC Netley regard neighbours Sholing, Hamble Club and Folland Sports as their main rivals - although with these all now playing at a higher level, meetings are not as frequent as they once were.

Older rivalries have been lost as Sholing Sports, Bitterne Nomads, Netley Athletic and Mullard Sports are all now defunct.
