= John Coham =

English footballer

Personal information
- Full name: John Harding Coham
- Date of birth: 12 March 1891
- Place of birth: Southampton, England
- Date of death: 4 May 1969 (aged 78)
- Place of death: Blackpool, England
- Position: Outside forward

Youth career
- St. Pauls Athletic

Senior career*
Years	Team	Apps	(Gls)
- Eastleigh Athletic
- Bishopstoke
1910–1911	Southampton	6	(0)
1911–1914	Partick Thistle		
- * Club domestic league appearances and goals

John Harding Coham (12 March 1891 – 4 May 1969) was an English professional footballer who made six appearances at outside-left in the Southern League for Southampton in 1911, before spending three seasons in the Scottish Football League with Partick Thistle.

== Early life ==
Coham was born in Southampton and attended St. Mark's Junior School, which was situated adjacent to The Dell, the home of Southampton F.C., before moving to Freemantle School.

== Football career ==
Coham played his youth football with St. Pauls Athletic before joining Eastleigh Athletic of the Hampshire League.

He joined Southampton in the summer of 1910, aged 18. Initially, he played in the reserve team. His first-team debut came on 4 February 1911, when he took the place of Joe Blake at outside-left for the Southern League match against Exeter City, with Blake moving inside in the absence of Harry Brown. Described as a "fleet-footed left-winger", Coham continued to deputise for Blake for the remainder of the season, making five further appearances; of Coham's six first-team matches, four ended in defeats with two draws as the "Saints" struggled to avoid relegation, winning only one match from February onwards.

In the summer of 1911, Coham moved to Scotland to join Partick Thistle, spending three seasons at Firhill Park before returning to Hampshire in 1914.
