= Jim Angell =

English footballer (1883–1960)

Personal information
- Full name: James William Angell
- Date of birth: January qtr. 1883
- Place of birth: Bitterne, Southampton, England
- Date of death: 4 January 1960 (aged 76)
- Place of death: Romsey, England
- Position: Right-half

Youth career
- Peartree
- Woolston Alma

Senior career*
Years	Team	Apps	(Gls)
1902–1908	Southampton	3	(0)
- Bitterne Guild
- Eastleigh Athletic
- * Club domestic league appearances and goals

James William Angell (1883 – 4 January 1960) was an English footballer who played at right-half for Southampton in the Southern League in 1906. He later coached the Thornycrofts team which took Burnley to a replay in the FA Cup in 1920, before becoming a scout for Arsenal and Norwich City. After retiring from playing football, he became a builder and property developer.

== Football career ==
Angell was born in Bitterne, Southampton and played youth football for various local minor clubs before joining Southampton in the summer of 1902, aged 19. He spent most of his time with the "Saints" in the reserves, winning Hampshire Senior Cup medals in 1905, 1907 and 1908.

His first-team debut came on 29 September 1906, when he replaced Jack Hogg at right-half for the Southern League match at Brentford, which was lost 2–1. He retained his place for the next two matches, a 5–1 home victory over Millwall and a 3–2 defeat at Clapton Orient, after which Hogg returned.

Angell later returned to local football with Bitterne Guild and Eastleigh Athletic.

== Coaching and scouting career ==
After the First World War, he was coach to the Thornycrofts team, when they reached the First Round proper of the FA Cup in January 1920. After victories over Dulwich Hamlet and Sheppey United, Thornycrofts were drawn against Burnley. The match, on 10 January 1920, was played at The Dell and ended in a goalless draw. In the replay three days later, Burnley's pedigree and experience prevailed, winning 5–0, with three goals from James Lindsay.

He was later recruited by Tom Parker as a scout to find potential players from the New Forest area, initially for Arsenal and, from 1933, for Norwich City. Amongst Angell's "discoveries" were George Woodford, a full-back who made ten appearances for Norwich City and seven for Southampton, and Eric Webber, who followed Parker to Southampton in 1937 and went on to play over 200 games for Southampton.

After Parker joined Southampton as manager in March 1937, Angell was appointed as manager of the Southampton "A" team.

In 1945, Angell was appointed manager at Romsey Town, becoming the club chairman in 1954 and president in 1956. He was also a member of the Hampshire Football Association from 1948 to 1955.

== Career outside football ==
By 1939, he had established himself as a builder, based in Woolston trading as J. Angell & Sons Limited, later to become Hilldene Angell, and his company's name was prominently displayed on a hoarding at The Dell for many years.
