= Warsash F.C. =

English football club

- Full name: Warsash Football Club
- Nickname: The Crabs
- Founded: 1895
- Dissolved: 1997
- Ground: Recreation Ground, Osbourne Road, Warsash
Home colours	Away colours

Warsash F.C. were a long running amateur football club based in Warsash - a fishing village based on the mouth of the river Hamble, east of Southampton, Hampshire.

== History ==
Warsash were formed in 1895 and spent their early days friendly matches, before becoming founder members of the Botley & District League.

They originally played at Fleet End Road, before the village recreation ground was cleared of bracken and gorse, double dug and drained. This hard work was carried out by local fishermen when they unable to put to sea during the winter months. Many village residents earned their living from the crab industry and this was how the football club became known as 'the Crabs'. In 1911 the first pavilion was erected, funded by voluntary subscription.

The twenties saw Warsash initially playing in the Meon Valley League before progressing on to the Southampton League. The post-war era saw renewed interest as the club won promotion to the Senior section for first time in 1947 where they continued to make steady progress.

The sixties saw 'the Crabs' fortunes take off as they won the Senior Division 1 title and reached four Southampton Senior Cup finals, all played at The Dell, Southampton. In 1965 they won 4-2 against Netley Sports and in 1967 they defeated Swaythling Athletic Reserves 2-0.

In 1968 Warsash made a successful application to join the expanding Hampshire League and were placed in Division 3 East, where they consolidated for a number of years. The club continued to thrive, running three teams along with a successful Sunday side. They even had their own Supporters Club and regularly played in front of large crowds. In 1970, they reached their fifth Southampton Senior Cup Final, losing 0-1 in a replay against Saints 'A'.

Warsash won the Division 3 title in 1974 and after several promising seasons in Division 2 they won promotion as runners-up in 1977. However, Division 1 proved to be much harder and they were relegated straight back again. The club remained a steady Division 2 side, but by the end of the eighties they were frequently struggling, and were relegated in 1989.

Back in the Southampton League, Warsash continued to struggle and suffered further relegation's down to Junior Division 1. They quickly regained their Senior status, but folded in 1997 after a disastrous season.

== Honours ==
- Hampshire League
  - Division 2 Runners-up 1976/77
  - Division 3 Champions 1973/74
- Southampton Football Association
  - Senior Cup Winners 1964/65 and 1966/67, Finalists 1961/62, 1963/64 and 1969/70
- Southampton League
  - Senior Division 1 Champions 1960/61, Runners-up 1957/58
  - Senior Division 2 Runners-up 1955/56
  - Junior Division 1 Runners-up 1946/47
  - Junior Division 2 Champions 1964/65 (2nd team)
  - Junior Division 8 Runners-up 1995/96 (2nd team)
  - Junior Division 10 Champions 1975/76 (3rd team)

== Hampshire League record 1968-89 ==
Season	Division	Position	Significant events
1968/69	Division 3 East	6/14	
1969/70	Division 3 East	9/16	Southampton Senior Cup finalists
1970/71	Division 3 East	4/16	
1971/72	Division 3	11/16	league re-structure
1972/73	Division 3	10/16	
1973/74	Division 3	1/16	Promoted
1974/75	Division 2	11/16	
1975/76	Division 2	4/16	
1976/77	Division 2	2/16	Promoted
1977/78	Division 1	15/16	Relegated
1978/79	Division 2	9/16	
1979/80	Division 2	14/16	
1980/81	Division 2	19/20	
1981/82	Division 2	10/20	
1982/83	Division 2	5/19	
1983/84	Division 2	14/18	
1984/85	Division 2	14/18	
1985/86	Division 2	17/18	
1986/87	Division 2	12/17	league re-structured following formation of Wessex League
1987/88	Division 2	17/19	
1988/89	Division 2	18/19	Left competition

== Ground ==
Warsash FC played at the Recreation Ground, Osbourne Road, Warsash, SO31 9GJ. .

The venue is now owned by Fareham Borough Council and has a single full-sized adult pitch with a pavilion located behind the goal. For many years, there was a second smaller pavilion at the opposite end for the match officials and a tea hut.

County league soccer returned in 2001 when the facility was sublet to the short-lived Fareham Sacred Hearts.

== Local rivalries ==
Warsash enjoyed a healthy local rivalry with a number of neighbouring clubs from the area including Locks Heath, Bursledon and Sarisbury Green.

== Notable players ==
Warsash had many fine players over the years, most notably stalwart Arthur Jupe and Billy Bevis who played for the club before and after a lengthy spell with Southampton.

== Successor club ==
Men's football finally returned to the village in 2007 when long running youth club Warsash Wasps (established in 1977) formed a senior section.

Upon formation, the new team enrolled in the Southampton League and made a great start, winning numerous titles and cups en route to the Hampshire League 2004 in 2010.

The Wasps, who also play at the same venue, have since returned to the Southampton League and run many teams at various age groups. They are affiliated to the Hampshire Football Association and have been awarded charter status.
