= Bitterne Nomads F.C. =

- Full name: Bitterne Nomads Football Club
- Founded: 1939; 87 years ago
- Dissolved: 1968; 58 years ago
- Ground: Cutbush Lane, West End, Southampton
Home colours	Away colours

Bitterne Nomads F.C. were an amateur football club, based in Bitterne - an eastern suburb of Southampton, Hampshire. They folded after the loss of their ground.

== History ==
Bitterne Nomads were formed in 1939, the suffix an indication of they number of venues used for home games.

They were the third club to represent the area, although any aspirations of emulating their successful predecessors Guild and Sports was soon halted by the outbreak of World War II. Despite this, Bitterne Nomads remained active and participated in various war time competitions.

The post war era saw renewed interest. In 1946 the club began using the Hatley Road Sports Ground, were elected into the Hampshire League Division 3 and also began entering the national cup competitions. Unfortunately, the loss of their ground forced them to leave the competition in 1949, and join the Southampton League.

Despite this set-back, Bitterne Nomads recovered by winning the Southampton Senior Cup in 1955 (2–1 against Winsor United at The Dell) and the Senior Division 1 title in 1959. Now playing at a nicely developed venue at Cutbush Lane, they made a returned to the county league in 1960 and immediately won promotion as Division 3 runners-up. In 1965 they were relegated back again, where they remained a steady force until 1968 when the loss of their ground prompted the club to fold.

== Honours ==
- Hampshire League
  - Division 3 Runners-up 1960/61
- Hampshire Football Association
  - Intermediate Cup Finalists 1952/53
- Southampton League
  - Senior Division 1 Champions 1958/59
  - Senior Division 2 Runners-up 1952/53
  - Senior East Division Runners-up 1950/51
  - Junior Eastern Division Champions 1952/53 and 1954/55 (Reserves)
- Southampton Football Association
  - Senior Cup Winners 1954/55

== Playing records ==
=== Hampshire League ===
Season	Division	Position	Significant events
1946/47	Division 3	9/12	
1947/48	Division 3 East	5/12	
1948/49	Division 3 East	6/14	Left competition
1949-60	-		Southampton League
1960/61	Division 3	2/16	Promoted
1961/62	Division 2	7/16	
1962/63	Division 2	11/16	
1963/64	Division 2	10/16	
1964/65	Division 2	16/16	Relegated
1966/66	Division 3	6/16	
1966/67	Division 3	6/16	
1967/68	Division 3	4/16	Left competition

=== FA Cup ===
Season	Round	Opponents	Result
1947/48	Preliminary Round	H v Thornycroft Athletic	L 2-3
1948/49	Extra-Preliminary Round	A v Basingstoke Town	W 2–1
	Preliminary Round	A v Newport IOW	L 0-4

=== FA Amateur Cup ===
Season	Round	Opponents	Result
1946/47	Preliminary Round	A v Sandown	W 4-2
	1st Qualifying Round	A v Poole Town	L 1-3
1947/48	1st Qualifying Round	H v Portsmouth Electricity	L 0-2
1948/49	Preliminary Round	A v Romsey Town	W 2-0
	1st Qualifying Round	A v Portsmouth Electricity	W 1-0
	2nd Qualifying Round	H v Portland United	D 0-0
	Replay	A v Portland United	L 2-3
1962/63	1st Qualifying Round	A v Gosport Borough	L 2-3
1963/64	1st Qualifying Round	A v Waterlooville	L 2-4

== Ground ==
Bitterne Nomads played at Cutbush Lane, Townhill Park, Southampton. The ground is now covered by housing and is not to be confused with the modern day council owned pitches known by the same name located at the opposite end of the road in West End.

== Notable players ==
Bitterne Nomads had many fine players, most notably Don Roper and Fred Turner who both went on to play for Southampton. Former Saints goalkeeper Eugene Bernard also played towards the end of his career.

== Local rivalries ==
With there being so many teams in the area, Bitterne Nomads had a number of local rivals. These included Sholing Sports, Thornycrofts (Woolston) and West End.

== Successor club ==
Bitterne Sports played in the Southampton League from 1972 until 1995. The club played on hired council pitches and reaching the Southampton FA Junior 'B' Cup final in 1989 was the closest they ever came to winning any silverware.

== Print ==
- Bitterne Nomads FC History by Ken Prior
- Bitterne Football - A glimpse at the past by Ken Prior
