= Bitterne Guild F.C. =

- Full name: Bitterne Guild Football Club
- Founded: 1896; 130 years ago
- Dissolved: 1915; 111 years ago
- Ground: Veracity Ground, Sholing, Southampton
Home colours

Bitterne Guild F.C. were an amateur football club, based in Bitterne - an eastern suburb of Southampton, Hampshire. They disbanded during World War I and did not reform once the conflict was finally over.

== History ==
Bitterne Guild were established circa 1896 and spent their early days playing friendlies before joining a variety of short lived local Leagues.

In 1905 the club took up residence at The Veracity Ground on Sholing Common, joined the Hampshire League and also began entering national cup competitions.

In those days, it was not uncommon for teams to play in more than one league in the same season, and in 1908 Bitterne Guild became founder members of the Southampton Football Association - winning the inaugural Senior League title and retaining it a year later. Further success arrived in 1911 when they won the Southampton Senior Cup (3-0 against Eastleigh Athletic at The Dell, Southampton), after reaching the two previous finals.

In order to attract wider support, the club was re-branded as Woolston F.C. in 1912 and again won the Senior League title. Two years later they again won the Southampton Senior Cup (2-1 against Rifle Depot) before the Great War stopped them playing, sadly never to reform.

== Honours ==
- Hampshire League
  - South Division runners-up: 1912–13
- Southampton League
  - Senior Division 1 champions: 1908–09, 1910–11, 1912–13
- Hampshire Football Association
  - Junior Cup Winners 1910-11 (Reserves)
- Southampton Football Association
  - Senior Cup winners: 1910–11, 1913–14. Runners-up: 1908–09, 1909–10
  - Junior 'A' Cup winners: 1908–09 (Reserves)

== Playing records ==
=== Hampshire League ===
Season	Division	Position	Significant events
1905/06	South Division	4/8	as Bitterne Guild
1906/07	South Division	3/10	
1907/08	South Division	4/8	
1908/09	South Division	3/10	
1909/10	South Division	7/9	
1910/11	South Division	4/8	
1911/12	South Division	5/8	
1912/13	South Division	2/8	as Woolston
1913/14	County Division	5/9	Left competition

=== FA Cup ===
Season	Round	Opponents	Result
1907/08	1st Qualifying Round	H v North Hants Ironworks	D 3-3
	Replay	H v North Hants Ironworks	W 3-1
	2nd Qualifying Round	H v Salisbury City	L 1–4
1908/09	1st Qualifying Round	H v Eastleigh Athletic	W 5-2
	2nd Qualifying Round	H v North Hants Ironworks	W 6-1
	3rd Qualifying Round	H v Cowes	L 2-4
1909/10	1st Qualifying Round	H v Farnham Town	W 5–1
	2nd Qualifying Round	H v Winchester City	W 7–1
	3rd Qualifying Round	H v Royal Engineers	W 2–0
	4th Qualifying Round	A v Leyton	L 1–9
1910/11	1st Qualifying Round	A v Cowes	D 1-1
	Replay	H v Cowes	L 0-3
1911/12	Preliminary Round	H v Farnham Town	W 9-0
	1st Qualifying Round	H v Cowes	W 3-0
	2nd Qualifying Round	A v Eastleigh Athletic	W 3-1
	3rd Qualifying Round	H v 1st Kings Royal Rifles	L 0-2
1912/13	Preliminary Round	A v Bournemouth Gasworks Athletic	W 4-0
	1st Qualifying Round	H v 1st Kings Royal Rifles	D 0-0
	Replay	A v 1st Kings Royal Rifles	L 1-2
1913/14	Preliminary Round	H v Cowes	L 0-2

== Ground ==
Bitterne Guild played at the original Veracity Ground, Sholing Common, Southampton. The land was originally owned by the Chamberlayne family - close to the present day site off Spring Road, which is known by the same name.

The pitch was enclosed with a stand and frequently hosted large crowds. In 1919 Thornycrofts (Woolston) moved in and also enjoyed success, until the site was closed in 1926 and sold for housing.

== Notable players ==
Bitterne Guild had many fine players during their short history, and their playing strength is clearly indicated by the fact that Arthur Dominy, George McGhee, Stan Smith, Joe Hoare, Jim Angell and Arthur Draper all went on to play for Southampton.

== Local rivalries ==
With there being so many teams in the area, there were a number of local rivals such as Peartree Green, Itchen Sports and Sholing Athletic.

== Successor clubs ==
In later years, both Bitterne Sports and Bitterne Nomads played with great success in the same competitions.

== Print ==
- Bitterne Football - A glimpse at the past by Ken Prior
