= Southampton Senior Cup =

- Founded: 1908
- Teams: varies
- Current champions: AFC Stoneham
- Most championships: Sholing (9)
- Website: https://www.wessexleague.co.uk/soton-senior-cup

The Southampton Senior Cup is a long running football competition open to teams who are members of the Southampton Divisional Football Association.

The competition is affiliated to the Hampshire Football Association, and with the final hosted by Southampton F.C. is always well contested between clubs that play from Level 12 upwards on the English football league system.

== History ==
Football had been played in the area for many years, but with the growing need for proper organisation, the Southampton Football Association was founded in 1908 at a meeting attended by 40 persons, including William Pickford. It was here that league and cup competitions were created, in the Senior and Junior format, which mostly remains in place today.

The Southampton Senior Cup was first held for the 1908/09 season. The trophy itself was donated to the Association by Mr Bernard Mortimer - better known locally for promoting boxing tournaments. The inaugural final was won by Eastleigh Athletic after a 2–0 victory over Bitterne Guild at The Dell, Southampton.

The competition soon grew in popularity with teams from the Hampshire League and Senior divisions of the Southampton League taking part, latterly joined by Wessex League and occasionally Southern League clubs.

There have also been many surprises and upsets, at various stages over the years, and the cup has been won by an interesting range of different clubs - some of which have enjoyed spells of dominance. Sholing Athletic, Netley Sports, AFC Totton and Vosper Thornycroft have all won the competition three years running, and the latter also hold the record for winning the competition on the most occasions. Until 1986, Southampton were regular entrants themselves, and a number of players who would go on to become well known professionals have a winners medal in their collection. To commemorate the competitions centenary, the 'Saints' entered their academy side for the 2017/18 season.

Since 2001, the final has been played at St Mary's Stadium with the show-piece event frequently attracting crowds of over a thousand.

=== Finals ===
| Season | Winner | Score | Runner-up | Venue |
|---|---|---|---|---|
| 1908/09 | Eastleigh Athletic | 2–0 | Bitterne Guild | The Dell |
| 1909/10 | Southampton Reserves | 4-1 | Bitterne Guild | The Dell |
| 1910/11 | Bitterne Guild | 3-0 * | Eastleigh Athletic | The Dell |
| 1911/12 | Southampton Reserves | 4–1 | Rifle Depot | The Dell |
| 1912/13 | Southampton Reserves | 4–1 | Cowes | The Dell |
| 1913/14 | Woolston | 2-1 | Rifle Depot | The Dell |
| 1919/20 | Sholing Athletic | 2-1 | Eastleigh Athletic | The Dell |
| 1920/21 | Sholing Athletic | 4-1 | Southampton Post Office | The Dell |
| 1921/22 | Sholing Athletic | 2-0 | Southampton Post Office | The Dell |
| 1922/23 | Harland & Wolff | 2-1 | Eastleigh Athletic | Botley |
| 1923/24 | Harland & Wolff | 2-0 | Sholing Athletic | The Dell |
| 1924/25 | Thornycrofts Woolston | 2-1 * | Harland & Wolff | The Dell |
| 1925/26 | Harland & Wolff | 4-2 | Bitterne Sports | The Dell |
| 1926/27 | Southampton Civil Service | 5-2 | Winchester City | The Dell |
| 1927/28 | Docks & Marine Sports | 3-1 | Romsey Town | The Dell |
| 1928/29 | Totton | 4-2 | Romsey Town | The Dell |
| 1929/30 | Totton | 4-2 * | Romsey Town | The Dell |
| 1930/31 | Docks & Marine Sports | 2-0 | Totton | The Dell |
| 1931/32 | Southampton Police | 2–0 | Bursledon Brickworks | The Dell |
| 1932/33 | Pirelli General | 4–2 * | Docks & Marine Sports | The Dell |
| 1933/34 | Docks & Marine Sports | 3-1 * | Pirelli General | The Dell |
| 1934/35 | Itchen Sports | 5-1 | Bramtoco Sports | The Dell |
| 1935/36 | Pirelli General Reserves | 3-2 * | Docks & Marine Sports | The Dell |
| 1936/37 | AGWI United | 2-1 | Itchen Sports | Totton |
| 1937/38 | AGWI United | 6-0 | Totton Reserves | The Dell |
| 1938/39 | Sholing | 3-1 | Southampton 'A' | The Dell |
| 1939/40 | Folland Aircraft | 2-1 | Sholing | The Dell |
| 1945/46 | Southampton 'B' | 4–1 | Whites Sports | The Dell |
| 1946/47 | Totton Reserves | 7–2 | Docks & Marine Sports | The Dell |
| 1947/48 | N.D.L.B. | 2–1 | Blackfield & Langley | The Dell |
| 1948/49 | Blackfield & Langley | 2–1 | Eastleigh Spartans | The Dell |
| 1949/50 | Winchester City Reserves | 4–1 | Austin Sports | The Dell |
| 1950/51 | Harland & Wolff | 2–1 | Austin Sports | The Dell |
| 1951/52 | Winchester City Reserves | 5-2 | Austin Sports | The Dell |
| 1952/53 | Old Bartonians | 1-0 | Southampton Gas Employees | The Dell |
| 1953/54 | Harland & Wolff | 2–0 | Winchester City Reserves | The Dell |
| 1955/55 | Bitterne Nomads | 2–1 | Winsor United | The Dell |
| 1955/56 | Netley Sports | 4–3 | Swaythling Athletic Reserves | The Dell |
| 1956/57 | Netley Sports | 1–0 | Old Bartonians | The Dell |
| 1957/58 | Netley Sports | 3-2 * | Swaythling Athletic Reserves | The Dell |
| 1958/59 | Old Issonians | 2–0 | Swaythling Athletic Reserves | The Dell |
| 1959/60 | Old Edwardians | 2–1 | Fair Oak | The Dell |
| 1960/61 | Old Issonians | 3-2 | Swaythling Athletic Reserves | The Dell |
| 1961/62 | Sholing Sports Reserves | 3-2 | Warsash | The Dell |
| 1962/63 | Awbridge | 3-1 | Sarisbury Green | The Dell |
| 1963/64 | Awbridge | 3–2 | Warsash | The Dell |
| 1964/65 | Warsash | 4-2 | Netley Sports | The Dell |
| 1965/66 | Pirelli General Reserves | 1-0 | Mottisfont | The Dell |
| 1966/67 | Warsash | 2–0 | Swaythling Athletic Reserves | The Dell |
| 1967/68 | Botley | 2–1 | Netley Sports | The Dell |
| 1968/69 | Redbridge Rovers | 5-2 | Mullard Sports | The Dell |
| 1969/70 | Southampton 'A' | 1-0 * | Warsash | The Dell |
| 1970/71 | Shirley Warren | 2-1 | Netley Central Sports Reserves | The Dell |
| 1971/72 | Netley Central Sports | 2-1 | Swaythling Athletic Reserves | The Dell |
| 1972/73 | Netley Central Sports | 2-1 | Southampton YMCA | The Dell |
| 1973/74 | Romsey Town | 2–1 | Totton Youth | The Dell |
| 1974/75 | Swaythling Athletic Reserves | 1-0 | Pirelli General Reserves | The Dell |
| 1975/76 | B.A.T. Sports | 3-2 | Botley | The Dell |
| 1976/77 | Southampton YMCA | 3-1 | Millbrook & Maybush | The Dell |
| 1977/78 | N.D.L.B. | 1-0 | Southampton 'A' | The Dell |
| 1978/79 | Swaythling Athletic Reserves | 1-0 | Old Issonians | The Dell |
| 1979/80 | Sholing Sports Reserves | 2-1 | B.A.T. Sports | The Dell |
| 1980/81 | AFC Totton | 2–0 * | Eastleigh Reserves | The Dell |
| 1981/82 | AFC Totton | 4-1 | West End | The Dell |
| 1982/83 | Southampton 'A' | 5-1 | North Baddesley | The Dell |
| 1983/84 | Southampton 'A' | 3-2 | North Baddesley | The Dell |
| 1984/85 | Folland Sports | 1-0 | Awbridge | The Dell |
| 1985/86 | Midanbury | 1-0 | Blackfield & Langley | The Dell |
| 1986/87 | Folland Sports | 1–0 | Sholing Sports | The Dell |
| 1987/88 | Eastleigh Reserves | 1–0 * | Colden Common | The Dell |
| 1988/89 | B.A.T. Sports | 3-0 | Blackfield & Langley | The Dell |
| 1989/90 | Pirelli General | 4-2 | Netley Central Sports | The Dell |
| 1990/91 | Blackfield & Langley | 4-3 | B.A.T. Sports Reserves | The Dell |
| 1991/92 | Aerostructures S&S Reserves | 2–0 | Braishfield | The Dell |
| 1992/93 | Blackfield & Langley | 5-1 | B.A.T. Sports Reserves | The Dell |
| 1993/94 | Colden Common | 1–0 | Fair Oak | The Dell |
| 1994/95 | Romsey Town | 2-1 | Esso (Fawley) | The Dell |
| 1995/96 | Otterbourne | 1–0 | B.A.T. Sports Reserves | The Dell |
| 1996/97 | Eastleigh Reserves | 3–0 | BTC Southampton | The Dell |
| 1997/98 | Blackfield & Langley | 6-3 | Brendon | The Dell |
| 1998/99 | Netley Central Sports | 1–0 | Brendon | The Dell |
| 1999/00 | AC Delco | 2-1 * | Blackfield & Langley | The Dell |
| 2000/01 | Winchester City | 2–0 | Nursling | The Dell |
| 2001/02 | Vosper Thornycroft | 1-0 | Nursling | St Mary's |
| 2002/03 | Winchester City | 5-0 | VTFC | St Mary's |
| 2003/04 | VTFC | 3-0 | AFC Totton Reserves | St Mary's |
| 2004/05 | Lyndhurst | 2–1 | Locksley Sports | St Mary's |
| 2005/06 | VTFC Reserves | 5–0 | Mottisfont | St Mary's |
| 2006/07 | VTFC Reserves | 0-0 ** | Spartans | St Mary's |
| 2007/08 | VTFC Reserves | 1–0 | Romsey Town Reserves | St Mary's |
| 2008/09 | Team Solent | 2–0 | Nursling | St Mary's |
| 2009/10 | VTFC Reserves | 2-0 | Team Solent | St Marys |
| 2010/11 | Team Solent | 3–1 | QK Southampton | St Mary's |
| 2011/12 | AFC Stoneham | 2–1 | Bush Hill | St Mary's |
| 2012/13 | AFC Stoneham | 2-2 ** | Brockenhurst | St Mary's |
| 2013/14 | Sholing Reserves | 5-0 | Hedge End Rangers | St Mary's |
| 2014/15 | Team Solent | 3–2 | Hamble Club | St Mary's |
| 2015/16 | Team Solent | 5-0 | Blackfield & Langley | St Mary's |
| 2016/17 | Sholing | 3-1 | Team Solent | St Mary's |
| 2017/18 | Southampton Academy | 6–0 | Blackfield & Langley | St Mary's |
| 2018/19 | Alresford Town | 3-0 | AFC Stoneham | St Mary's |
| 2019/20 | Not played due to Covid-19 | - | Blackfield & Langley v Bush Hill | |
| 2021/22 | AFC Totton | 3-0 | Folland Sports | St Mary's |
| 2022/23 | AFC Totton | 3–0 | Sholing | St Mary's |
| 2023/24 | AFC Totton | 4-0 | Hythe & Dibden | Totton |
| 2024/25 | AFC Stoneham | 3-0 | Millbrook | St Mary's |
| 2025/26 | AFC Stoneham | 2-1 | Millbrook | Eastleigh |
| 2026/27 | | | | |
| Notes | * = Replay | | ** = won on penalties | |

=== Most winners ===
- 9 - Sholing
- 8 - Southampton and AFC Totton
- 6 - Sholing Sports and Netley Central Sports
- 5 - Harland & Wolff
- 4 - Eastleigh, Winchester City, Blackfield & Langley, Folland Sports, Pirelli General, Team Solent and AFC Stoneham.

=== Most final appearances ===
- 11 - Eastleigh, AFC Totton and Sholing
- 10 - Southampton, Blackfield & Langley and Netley Central Sports
- 9 - Sholing Sports
- 7 - Totton & Eling and BTC Southampton
- 6 - Winchester City, Romsey Town, Pirelli General, Team Solent and Harland & Wolff
- 5 - Folland Sports, Warsash and AFC Stoneham
- 4 - Eastleigh Athletic and Bitterne Guild

These stats include wins either under clubs' previous identities and by Reserve/'A' sides.

== Past and present clubs ==
- See Southampton League Clubs

== Print ==
- Southampton Senior Cup – The Finals 1909–2022 by Gary Day
- A Century of Southampton Local Soccer 1908–2008 by John Moody
- Southampton Divisional Football Association Handbook - produced annually
