= Thornycrofts (Woolston) F.C. =

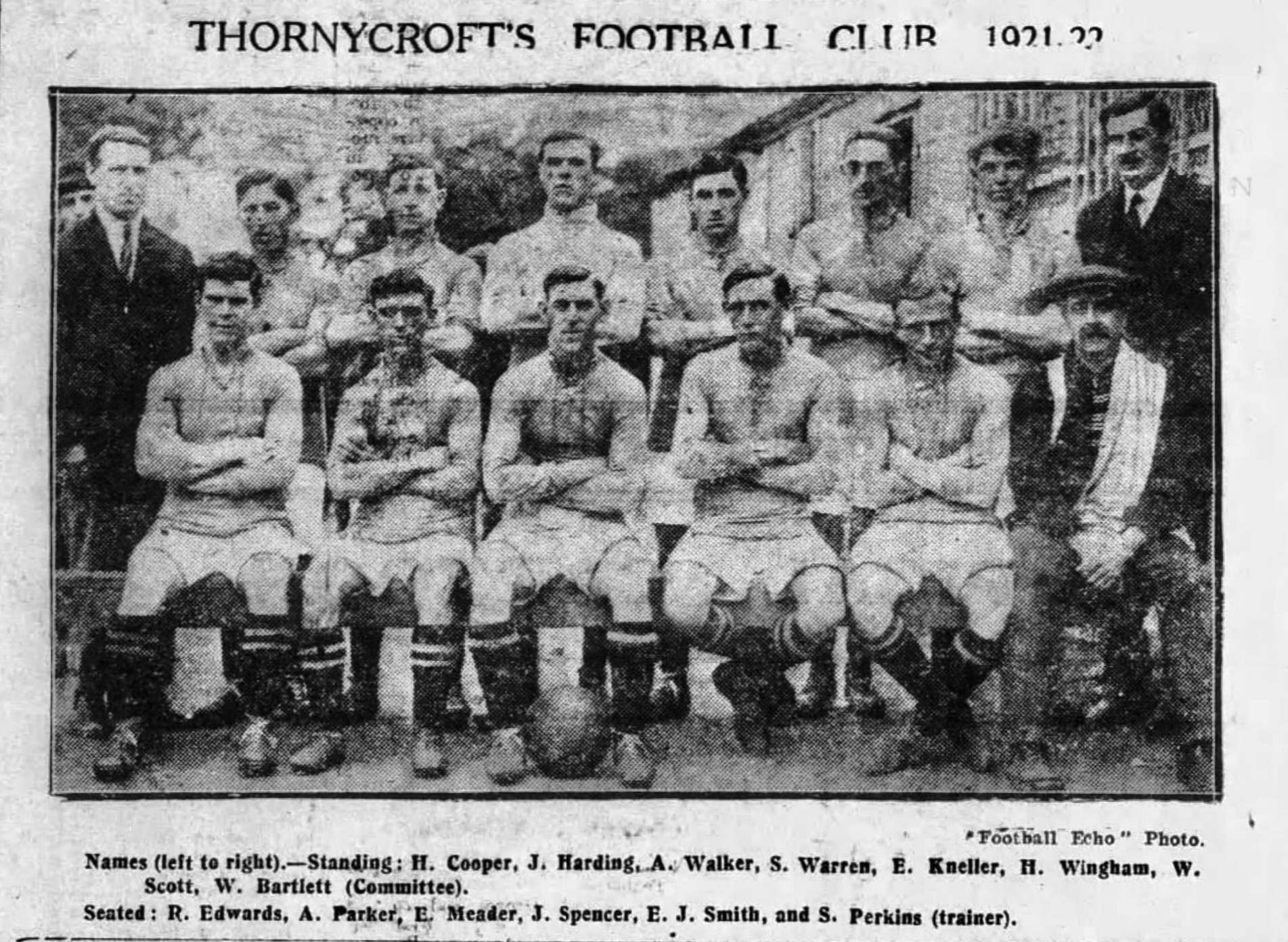
- 1921–22 squad on 15 October 1921
- Full name: Thornycrofts (Woolston) Football Club
- Nickname: Thorny
- Founded: c. 1910
- Dissolved: 1926
- Ground: Veracity Ground, Sholing, Southampton
Home colours	Away colours

Thornycrofts (Woolston) F.C. were an English amateur football club, based in Woolston, Southampton.

== History ==
Teams from the Woolston Works had competed as early as 1878 under various names, and were winners of several competitions - including the inaugural Hampshire Senior Cup in 1888.

This incarnation was founded circa 1910 by employees of John I. Thornycroft & Company, the Woolston-based shipbuilders. Adopting the company name, they initially played in the Southampton League, winning the Junior 'A' Division in 1913.

During the First World War they participated in the South Hants War League in 1917–18 and 1918–19, finishing second and third respectively.

By the time the conflict had finally finished, Thornycrofts had moved to the Veracity Ground and assembled a fine side - coached by former Southampton player, Jim Angell. In 1919 they joined the Hampshire League and entered the qualifying rounds of the FA Cup, where after victories over Dulwich Hamlet (won 3–1) and Sheppey United (won 4–0), the club were drawn against Burnley. The match, on 10 January 1920, was played at Fratton Park and ended in a goalless draw. In the replay three days later, Burnley's pedigree and experience prevailed, winning 5–0, with three goals from James Lindsay. Goalkeeper "Gus" Thompson was singled out for particular praise for his performances in both matches.

In 1920, the Southern League underwent a complete re-organisation, with most of the professional teams leaving to form the new Football League Third Division. Thornycrofts were elected to join the new English section of the league, but after only four victories from 24 matches, they finished at the bottom of the table and returned to the Hampshire League.

The club continued to enter the national cup competitions until 1925 but were unable to repeat their earlier heroics, although in 1921 they narrowly lost 0-1 away to Boscombe. They enjoyed better success locally, and in 1923 reached the Hampshire Senior Cup final - losing 2-4 against local rivals Sholing Athletic then two years later won the Southampton Senior Cup, 2-1 in a replay against dockyard rivals Harland & Wolff. Both games were played in front of large crowds at The Dell, Southampton. Thorny's also twice won the Russell Cotes Cup.

Thornycrofts disbanded in 1926 when the Veracity Ground was sold for housing. However, a few years later they reformed and continued to play on/off in the Southampton League for many years.

== Colours ==
The club wore blue jerseys, white shorts, and black socks, with a change shirt of red.

== Ground ==
Thornycrofts (Woolston) played at the original Veracity Ground, Sholing Common, Southampton. They took over the lease after the previous tenants Bitterne Guild disbanded during the Great War.

The pitch was enclosed with a stand and frequently hosted large crowds, although for the 1920 FA Cup tie with Burnley, they had to use Fratton Park.

== Successor Club ==
- See Sholing F.C.
