= George McGhee (footballer) =

English footballer

Personal information
- Full name: George Dilworth McGhee
- Date of birth: 23 May 1883
- Place of birth: Egmanton, Nottinghamshire, England
- Date of death: 9 October 1944 (aged 61)
- Place of death: Weston, Nottinghamshire, England
- Position: Forward

Senior career*
Years	Team	Apps	(Gls)
?−1904	Newark Town		
1904–1905	Doncaster Rovers	11	(3)
1905–1907	Gainsborough Trinity	2	(0)
1907–1908	Bitterne Guild		
1908–1909	Southampton	2	(0)
1909–?	Bitterne Guild		
- Southampton Pirates
- Southampton Cambridge
- * Club domestic league appearances and goals

George Dilworth McGhee (25 May 1883 – 9 October 1944) was an English footballer who played as a forward in the early 1900s for Doncaster Rovers, Gainsborough Trinity and Southampton. By profession, he was a schoolteacher, but during World War I he was dismissed from the army after a court martial.

== Football career ==
McGhee was born in Egmanton, Nottinghamshire and was at Newark Town before signing for Doncaster Rovers who had just been elected to Football League Division 2 for their second spell there. He played at inside right, scoring on his debut on 7 January 1905 in a 3–0 victory against Leicester Fosse. Possibly his most notable achievement was scoring against Liverpool, although Rovers lost 4–1.

Doncaster were not re-elected after that season, having had their worst ever season, finishing bottom of the league with just 8 points. McGhee moved to Gainsborough Trinity who were one of the better clubs in Division 2 at the time. After only two appearances, his teaching career took him away from Lincolnshire to Southampton.

Some time later, McGhee's footballing skills at Bitterne Guild came to the notice of Southern League Southampton who recruited him on amateur terms in 1908. After a few matches for the reserves, he was given his first-team debut at centre forward for the Southern League match against Reading on 5 December 1908, which resulted in a 1–1 draw. For the next match, Frank Costello took over at centre-forward and it was not until nearly three months later that McGhee was given another opportunity, this time at inside-right. He sustained an injury in the match at Millwall which ended his career in top flight football.

McGhee continued to play football as an amateur for various clubs, including Bitterne Guild and Southampton Cambridge. In the summer of 1909, he was a member of the "Southampton Pirates" team which toured Europe; also in the side was the Southampton player, Alec Campbell.

== Teaching career ==
He was a teacher at Ipswich Municipal Secondary School before taking up a post at King Edward VI School, Southampton for the Christmas 1907 term. At King Edwards, he was a popular teacher who was responsible for sport at the school. In the 1908 school magazine, his contribution to the school was highly praised:

Our success is due chiefly to the very excellent form shown by Mr. McGhee, both with the cricket bat and football. Never has a school had so brilliant a sportsman and popular a master as Mr. McGhee. In football last season he often won games outright by his individual prowess ...

== Military career ==
McGhee continued to teach at King Edwards until the summer of 1915 when the school governors gave him permission to enlist. He joined The Sherwood Foresters (Nottinghamshire and Derbyshire Regiment) from the Artists Rifles Officers Training Corps and in January 1916 he was promoted to the rank of second lieutenant. Shortly afterwards, however, he was dismissed from "His Majesty's Service" following a court martial on 6 March 1916.
