= Pirelli General F.C. =

- Full name: Pirelli General Football Club
- Nickname: Cablemen
- Founded: 1916
- Dissolved: 2003
- Ground: Jubilee Sports Ground, Chestnut Avenue, Eastleigh
Home colours	Away colours

Pirelli General F.C. were a long-running amateur football club based in Eastleigh, Hampshire. For a time they were the top club in the town and played in the Hampshire League until they ceased to exist in 2003.

== History ==
The club was founded in 1916 as the works side of the Pirelli General cable making company. They initially played in the Winchester & District and Eastleigh Leagues before transferring to the larger Southampton League.

By 1933 Pirelli's were playing at Dew Lane (fondly known locally as 'Eastleigh Wembley') and were fielding six sides. The 1st Team enjoyed an excellent season, winning the Senior Division 1 title and the Southampton Senior Cup for the first time. This saw them elected to the Hampshire League Division 2 where they finished runners-up in their debut season before winning the title the following year and establishing themselves in Division 1.

Once normal football had resumed after World War II, Pirelli's returned to the county league where they were placed in Division 2 and 'The Cablemen' were regular FA Cup entrants at this time, although never progressing beyond the preliminary rounds. However, despite winning the Hampshire Intermediate Cup in 1955–56, it was not until 1962–63 that Pirelli's returned to the top flight when they won the Division 2 title.

In 1965 Pirelli's moved to their best known home ground at Chestnut Avenue in Eastleigh, and the club remained a steady Division 1 outfit, twice finishing 3rd in the late sixties.

The seventies was the golden age for Pirelli's, especially the 1971–72 season when they were Division 1 Champions. The next fourteen years saw the club remain regular title contenders and in 1976–77 they caused a big upset when they defeated favourites Farnborough Town 1–0 to win the Hampshire Senior Cup.

In 1986 the Wessex League was formed (mostly by the Hampshire League's top clubs) but Pirelli's remained loyal and were again champions in 1992–93.

Despite the parent company moving out of Eastleigh, Pirelli's continued to play in the top-flight of the Hampshire League until the loss of their ground in 2003 saw the club withdraw from the competition and fold.

== Honours ==
=== 1st Team ===
- Hampshire League
  - Division 1 Champions 1971/72 and 1992/93
  - Division 2 Champions 1934/35, 1962/63, Runners-up 1933/34 and 1946/47
- Hampshire Football Association
  - Senior Cup Winners 1976/77, Finalists 1968/69 and 1977/78
  - Intermediate Cup Winners 1955/56
- Southampton Football Association
  - Senior Cup Winners 1932/33, 1935/36 and 1989/90, Finalists 1933/34
- Southampton League
  - Senior Division 1 Champions 1932/33
- All England Cable Makers Cup
  - Winners 1951/52, 1974/75 and 1978/79

=== 2nd Team ===
- Southampton Football Association
  - Senior Cup Winners 1965/66, Finalists 1974/75
- Southampton League
  - Senior Division 1 Champions 1935/36 and 1991/92

=== 3rd Team ===
- Southampton Football Association
  - Junior 'B' Cup Winners 1971/72
- Southampton League
  - Junior Division 4 Champions 1957/58
  - Junior Division 5 Champions 1990/91

== Playing records ==
=== Hampshire League ===
Season	Division	Position	Significant events
1933/34	Division 2	2/12	Runners-up, not promoted
1934/35	Division 2	1/16	Champions, promoted
1935/36	Division 1	6/16	
1936/37	Division 1	4/16	
1937/38	Division 1	15/16	
1938/39	Division 1	16/16	Relegated
1939-46			
1946/47	Division 2	2/12	Runners-up, not promoted
1947/48	Division 2	5/12	
1948/49	Division 2	9/14	
1949/50	Division 2	8/14	
1950/51	Division 2	5/14	
1951/52	Division 2	5/14	
1952/53	Division 2	12/14	
1953/54	Division 2	12/14	
1954/55	Division 2	7/14	
1955/56	Division 2	6/16	
1956/57	Division 2	4/16	
1957/58	Division 2	9/16	
1958/59	Division 2	5/16	
1959/60	Division 2	9/16	
1960/61	Division 2	10/16	
1961/62	Division 2	11/16	
1962/63	Division 2	1/16	Champions, promoted
1963/64	Division 1	11/16	
1964/65	Division 1	8/16	
1965/66	Division 1	9/16	
1966/67	Division 1	7/16	
1967/68	Division 1	3/16	
1968/69	Division 1	3/16	
1969/70	Division 1	10/16	
1970/71	Division 1	4/16	
1971/72	Division 1	1/16	Champions
1972/73	Division 1	5/16	
1973/74	Division 1	7/16	
1974/75	Division 1	3/16	
1975/76	Division 1	7/16	
1976/77	Division 1	7/16	
1977/78	Division 1	7/16	
1978/79	Division 1	6/16	
1979/80	Division 1	5/16	
1980/81	Division 1	14/20	
1981/82	Division 1	19/20	Not relegated
1982/83	Division 1	5/20	
1983/84	Division 1	3/20	
1984/85	Division 1	5/20	
1985/86	Division 1	9/20	Re-organisation due to formation of Wessex League in 1986
1986/87	Division 1	14/18	
1987/88	Division 1	16/18	
1988/89	Division 1	3/17	
1989/90	Division 1	7/18	
1990/91	Division 1	7/18	
1991/92	Division 1	4/18	
1992/93	Division 1	1/17	Champions, not promoted
1993/94	Division 1	4/20	
1994/95	Division 1	7/20	
1995/96	Division 1	9/20	
1996/97	Division 1	16/21	
1997/98	Division 1	8/20	
1998/99	Division 1	14/19	
1999/00	Premier Division	8/22	Re-organisation
2000/01	Premier Division	5/21	
2001/02	Premier Division	12/21	
2002/03	Premier Division	16/20	Left competition

=== FA Cup ===
Season	Round	Opponents	Result
1947/48	Extra-Preliminary Round	A v Andover	L 0–7
1948/49	Extra-Preliminary Round	H v Romsey Town	L 2–5
1949/50	Preliminary Round	H v Cowes	L 3–4
1950/51	Extra-Preliminary Round	A v Thornycroft Athletic	D 5-5
	Replay	H v Thornycroft Athletic	W 3–2
	Preliminary Round	H v Hamworthy United	L 1–2

=== FA Amateur Cup ===
Season	Round	Opponents	Result
1950/51	Preliminary Round	A v Portland United	W 5–2
	1st Qualifying Round	A v Shaftesbury	W 4–1
	2nd Qualifying Round	H v Winchester City	L 0–1
1951/52	Preliminary Round	A v Alton Town	L 2-5
1952/53	Preliminary Round	H v RAMC Aldershot	L 0–1
1953/54	Extra-Preliminary Round	H v East Cowes Victoria	L 1-4
1956/57	Preliminary Round	A v Ryde Sports	W 3–1
	1st Qualifying Round	H v Winchester City	L 2-3
1957/58	1st Qualifying Round	A v Ryde Sports	D 1–1
	Replay	H v Ryde Sports	W 3-2
	2nd Qualifying Round	A v Bournemouth Gasworks	D 3–3
	Replay	H v Bournemouth Gasworks	W 6–3
	3rd Qualifying Round	A v Hamworthy	W 3–1
	4th Qualifying Round	A v Devizes Town	L 2-3
1958/59	Preliminary Round	A v Totton	L 1-4
1959/60	Preliminary Round	A v Totton	D 0-0
	Replay	H v Totton	W 1-0
	1st Qualifying Round	A v Fareham Town	L 2-5
1960/61	Preliminary Round	H v Totton	W 4-3
	1st Qualifying Round	A v Fareham Town	L 2-5
1961/62	Preliminary Round	H v Totton	W 4-1
	1st Qualifying Round	H v Swaythling Athletic	W 3-2
	2nd Qualifying Round	H v Winchester City	W 5-1
	3rd Qualifying Round	A v Gosport Borough	L 1-4
1962/63	Preliminary Round	H v Totton	L 1-4
1963/64	Preliminary Round	A v Bournemouth	L 2-3
1964/65	1st Qualifying Round	H v Swaythling Athletic	W 3-2
	2nd Qualifying Round	H v Winchester City	W 6-2
	3rd Qualifying Round	A v Waterlooville	D 0-0
	Replay	H v Waterlooville	L 0-2
1965/66	Preliminary Round	A v Longfleet St Marys	W 8-2
	1st Qualifying Round	H v Waterlooville	L 0-2
1967/68	1st Qualifying Round	H v Portsmouth RN	W 1-0
	2nd Qualifying Round	A v Hawker-Siddeley	W 4-2
	3rd Qualifying Round	H v Waterlooville	L 1-3
1968/69	Preliminary Round	A v Waterlooville	L 1-3
1969/70	1st Qualifying Round	H v Moneyfield Sports	W 4-2
	2nd Qualifying Round	H v Portsmouth RN	D 1-1
	Replay	A v Portsmouth RN	W 7-0
	3rd Qualifying Round	H v Brockenhurst	L 0-1

=== FA Vase ===
Season	Round	Opponents	Result
1977/78	Preliminary Round	H v Chichester City	W 2–0
	Round 1	H v Farnham Town	W 6–1
	Round 2	A v Gosport Borough	L 1–3
1981/82	Preliminary Round	H v Sholing Sports	L 1–2
1982/83	Preliminary Round	H v Romsey Town	L 0–1
1983/84	Preliminary Round	H v Farnham Town	L 0–1
1984/85	Preliminary Round	H v Thatcham Town	W 2–0
	Round 1	H v Wilton Rovers	W 3–0
	Round 2	A v Sharpness	L 1–2
1985/86	Preliminary Round	H v Lancing	W 4–1
	Round 1	H v Malden Vale	W 3–2
	Round 2	H v AFC Totton	L 0–2

== Ground ==
Pirelli General played at the Jubilee Sports Ground at Chestnut Avenue in Eastleigh.

The 20 acre site had three adult pitches, with the main one enclosed with floodlights and a wooden stand. This, along with its easy access and large car park made the ground a popular choice for hosting local cup finals until it was redeveloped in 1993 with the addition of a golf range.

After the club's demise, the ground sat unused until 2010 when AFC Stoneham took up residence. In 2020 the venue was sold for housing.

== Notable players ==
Scottish striker Craig McAllister began his career with Pirelli before joining neighbours Eastleigh in 2001 then going on to play professionally for a number of clubs.

- See Pirelli General players for full list.

== Local rivalries ==
With there being so many teams in the area, Pirelli General had many local rivals. These mostly included Eastleigh, AC Delco, Eastleigh Athletic, Ford Sports and BTC Southampton.
