= Danny Ings =

English footballer (born 1992)

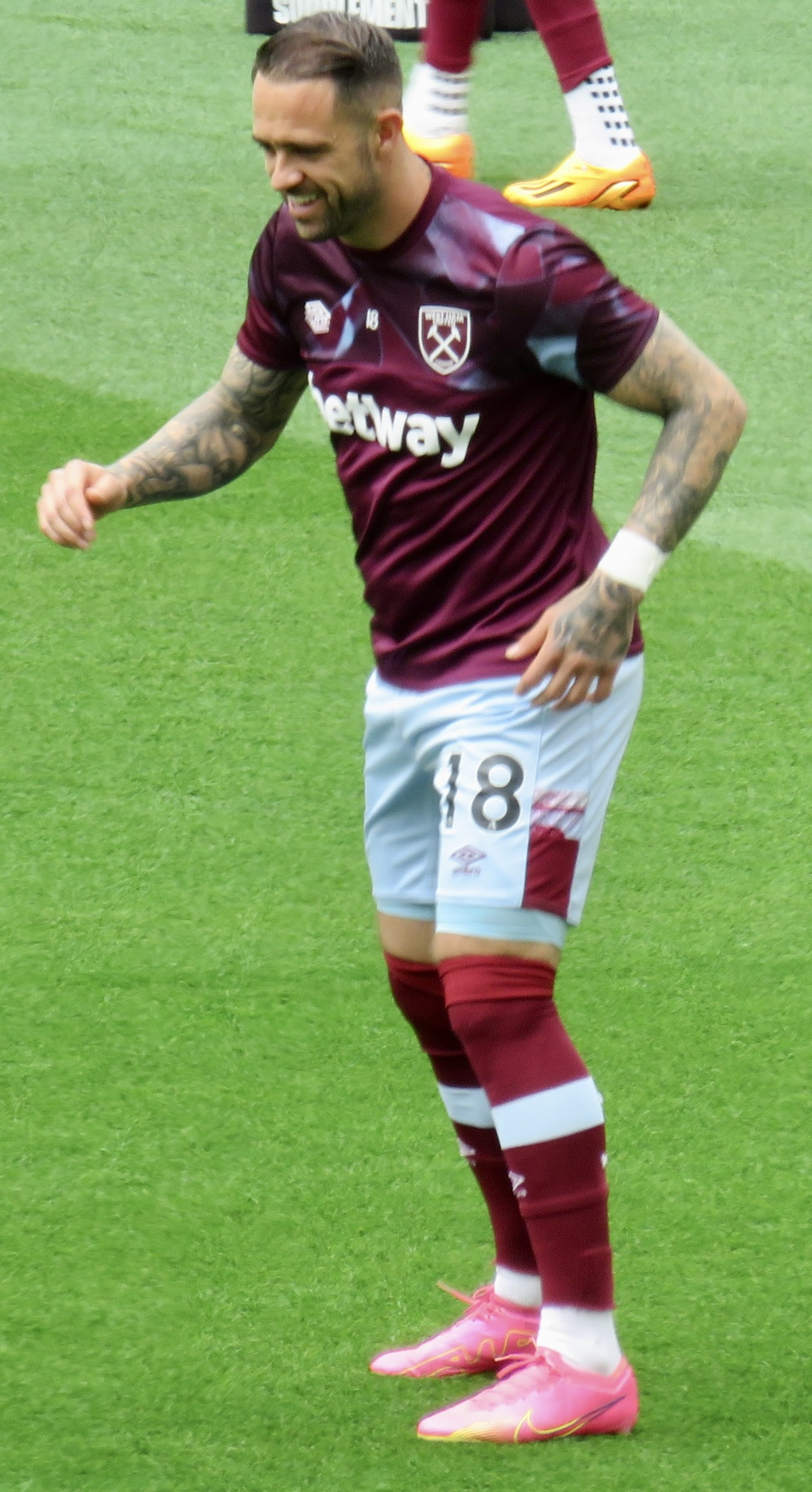
- Ings with West Ham United in 2023

Personal information
- Full name: Daniel William John Ings
- Date of birth: 23 July 1992 (age 34)
- Place of birth: Winchester, England
- Height: 5 ft 10 in (1.78 m)
- Position: Striker

Team information
- Current team: Wycombe Wanderers
- Number: 28

Youth career
- Netley Central Sports
- Southampton
- Itchen Tyro
- 2008–2009: Bournemouth

Senior career*
Years	Team	Apps	(Gls)
2009–2011	Bournemouth	27	(7)
2010	→ Dorchester Town (loan)	9	(4)
2011–2015	Burnley	122	(38)
2015–2019	Liverpool	14	(3)
2018–2019	→ Southampton (loan)	24	(7)
2019–2021	Southampton	67	(34)
2021–2023	Aston Villa	48	(13)
2023–2025	West Ham United	52	(4)
2025–2026	Sheffield United	23	(2)
2026–	Wycombe Wanderers	2	(1)

International career
2013–2015	England U21	13	(4)
2015–2020	England	3	(1)
- * Club domestic league appearances and goals as of 17:48, 13 November 2026 (UTC)

Daniel William John Ings (born 23 July 1992) is an English professional footballer who plays as a striker for EFL League One club Wycombe Wanderers.

Ings started his career in the youth team of Southampton but was released as a schoolboy. He subsequently joined Bournemouth, progressing through their youth system, while also spending time at Dorchester Town on loan. In 2011, Ings joined Burnley with whom he won the 2013–14 Championship Player of the Year, and helped them achieve promotion to the Premier League. Following Burnley's relegation, and the expiry of his contract with the club, Ings moved to Liverpool in the summer of 2015, but his first season at the club was ended after two months due to injury. His second season with Liverpool was also marred by injury, with Ings only making two appearances throughout the 2016–17 season.

Ings joined Southampton on loan in August 2018, before the move was made permanent in July 2019. He moved to Aston Villa in 2021 and subsequently to West Ham United in January 2023. He would not be retained upon the expiry of his contract in June 2025. He then signed for Sheffield United in August 2025, before being released in May 2026. In September 2026, Ings joined Wycombe Wanderers.

Formerly an under-21 international, Ings made his senior debut for England in October 2015.

== Club career ==
=== Early life and career ===
Ings was born in Winchester, Hampshire and grew up in Netley, Hampshire. As a child he attended Netley Abbey Primary School, Hamble Community Sports College and Brockenhurst College.

Ings dreamed of playing for local club Southampton, but was rejected for being too small. He signed for Southampton from Netley Central Sports, before being released as a schoolboy. After his release, Ings played for Itchen Tyro.

=== AFC Bournemouth ===
He signed a two-year apprentice contract with AFC Bournemouth in May 2008, having progressed through the club's Centre of Excellence while he was still at secondary school at Hamble Community Sports College. He had also previously had experience playing for the reserve team. He made his professional debut for Bournemouth on 6 October 2009, in a 2–1 away defeat to Northampton Town in the Football League Trophy, replacing Jason Tindall in the second half as a substitute. His second season in the youth team was blighted by a long-term abdominal injury, which restricted his playing time. He remained with the youth team until the summer of 2010, when he signed a short-term three-month contract. He extended his contract in September 2010, until the end of the 2010–11 campaign.

In September 2010, he was sent on an initial one-month loan to Conference South club Dorchester Town. His debut for the Magpies came on 11 September 2010, scoring the equaliser in a 2–1 home defeat to Ebbsfleet United. His second goal for Dorchester came on 24 September, scoring a penalty in a 4–1 win over Mangotsfield United in the FA Cup. On 6 October, his loan was extended for a further month. His next goal came in a 4–1 defeat to Havant & Waterlooville as the Magpies were knocked out of the FA Cup. On 16 October, he scored the second in a 2–0 league win over Lewes, after coming on as a late substitute for Giuseppe Sole. He got his fifth goal in a 2–1 away win over Staines Town, scoring the opener. His first goal in November came in a 2–1 home defeat to Maidenhead United, which ended an unbeaten run of six matches. On 12 November 2010, his loan was extended for a third time for an additional month. He scored the second in a 3–1 win over Weston-super-Mare in the FA Trophy to help them progress to the next round. On 23 November, his spell at Dorchester was cut short as he was recalled from his loan by Bournemouth due to an injury crisis at the club.

On 30 November, he signed a new contract extension which lasted until 2012. He made his league debut and first start for Bournemouth on 28 December 2010, in a 2–0 away defeat to Milton Keynes Dons in League One, where he was substituted off in the first half for Steve Fletcher. He started to become a first-team regular and scored his first professional goal against Swindon Town on 1 February 2011, in a 3–2 win at Dean Court. His form saw him rewarded with a new contract extension, lasting until 2013. On 26 February 2011, he scored a header to equalise in a 2–1 win away at Dagenham & Redbridge in the league. On 1 April he added to his tally with a goal against Peterborough United in a 3–3 draw. He went through a rich vein of goalscoring from in April, scoring four goals in three matches. He scored an overhead kick to equalise in the last minute against Tranmere Rovers, however, the Cherries went on to lose the match 2–1. He also scored in a 2–0 away victory over Notts County. He scored his first brace in a 2–2 draw with Yeovil Town, including one penalty. His final goal for Bournemouth came in the last match of the season, in the play-off semi-final defeat to Huddersfield Town, as Bournemouth were knocked out on penalties.

In the summer of 2011, he was linked with reported moves away from Bournemouth with Celtic, Liverpool and Newcastle United. Premier League club Fulham also had a £400,000 bid rejected by the club. In July 2011, he was rewarded with his fifth contract in twelve months, improving his deal to be one of the top earners at the club. He remained at the club through pre-season and started in the first match of the season in a 3–0 away defeat to Charlton Athletic. It proved to be his final appearance for the club.

=== Burnley ===
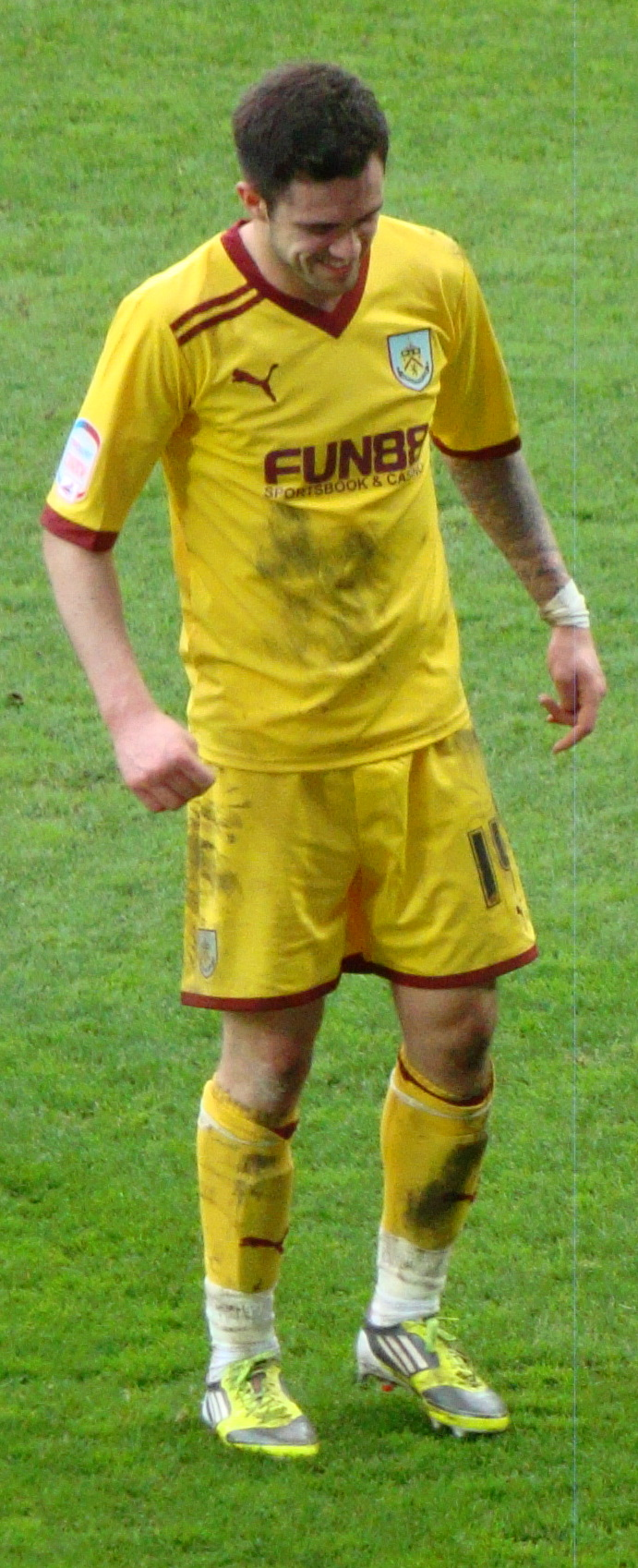
Ings playing for Burnley in 2012

On 15 August 2011, Ings signed for Championship club Burnley for an undisclosed fee believed to be in the region of £1 million, on a four-year contract. He rejoined former Bournemouth manager Eddie Howe who had made the same move eight months earlier.

He made his debut on 14 February 2012, in a 2–0 win over Barnsley at Turf Moor, where he came on as a late substitute for Charlie Austin. His first start came a month later on 10 March 2012, in a 1–1 home draw with Crystal Palace in the league. His first goal for Burnley came on 31 March, in a 5–1 win against Portsmouth at Fratton Park. His second goal came in the following match, where he scored the equaliser in a 3–1 defeat to Birmingham City. He scored his third goal of the season in the final match of the season, a 30-yard strike in a 1–1 home draw with Bristol City.

He started the 2012–13 season as a first choice regular in pre-season following the sale of striker Jay Rodriguez to Southampton. He suffered another serious knee injury in the final pre-season match, a 3–1 defeat to Rochdale. He tore the knee cartilage in the opposite knee to the previous season which resulted in surgery, keeping him out of action for up to six months.

Following the departure of top-scorer Charlie Austin to Queens Park Rangers, Ings became the main striker ahead of the 2013–14 season. He put together a string of impressive performances in the Clarets' pre-season campaign and scored two goals in the opening three league matches as well as a goal in the League Cup against York City. For his continued good start to the season Ings was named the Championship Player of the Month for October.

In March 2014, Ings won Championship Player of the Year at the Football League Awards, ahead of the two other nominees: Leeds United striker Ross McCormack and Leicester City midfielder Danny Drinkwater. He ended the 2013–14 Championship season with 22 goals as Burnley finished second and gained promotion to the Premier League.

On 19 August 2014, Ings made his Premier League debut in a 3–1 loss to Chelsea at Turf Moor. His first Premier League goal came in a 1–3 defeat to Everton on 26 October.

On 22 November 2014, Ings scored both of Burnley's goals in a 2–1 win at Stoke City for their first away win of the Premier League season, his two goals coming in the space of two minutes. He made his 100th league appearance for Burnley in a 1–0 win against Southampton on 13 December.

During January and February 2015, Ings scored five goals in six Premier League matches, helping the team to achieve draws with Newcastle United and West Bromwich Albion, and defeat Queens Park Rangers. In May, he scored the winning goal in 1–0 victories over Hull City and Aston Villa respectively to end the season with 11 goals from 35 league appearances.

=== Liverpool ===
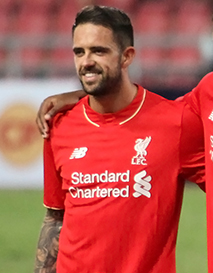
Ings lining up for Liverpool in 2015

On 8 June 2015, Liverpool announced that they had agreed on personal terms with Ings, subject to a medical, as well as a developmental fee due to Burnley for players under 24, to be negotiated between two clubs or determined by a tribunal. Under tribunal the fee would be decided by the Professional Football Compensation Committee. On 28 April 2016, the saga was finally settled. Liverpool would pay Burnley a record fee for a tribunal hearing: £6.5 million up front, with an extra £1.5 million in player performance-related bonuses. Burnley later gained an additional £3.6m due to a clause which saw them get 20% of the £18m Liverpool received from selling Ings to Southampton.

Ings made his competitive debut on 29 August 2015 in a 3–0 defeat against West Ham at Anfield. He made his European debut for the club on 17 September in the UEFA Europa League group stage match against Bordeaux, as a substitute for Divock Origi in a 1–1 draw. Three days later, he replaced Christian Benteke at half-time and within three minutes scored his first Liverpool goal in a 1–1 draw against Norwich City. On 4 October 2015, he scored in a 1–1 draw against Everton in the Merseyside derby.

On 15 October 2015, in his first training session under new manager Jürgen Klopp, Ings suffered an anterior cruciate ligament injury in his left knee and was ruled out for the remainder of the season. However, Ings returned sooner than anticipated, making a substitute appearance in the final match of the season, a 1–1 draw away to West Bromwich Albion. Ings began the 2016–17 season playing in the reserves to help regain fitness. On 25 October 2016, Ings sustained damage to his right knee in a League Cup match against Tottenham Hotspur that would require another spell on the sidelines of up to 9 months. He successfully underwent surgery to repair the damage to his knee and began rehabilitation at Melwood on 9 November.

On 19 September 2017, Ings made his first appearance in 11 months since the injury when he came on as a second-half substitute in the 2–0 defeat to Leicester City in the EFL Cup. On 21 April 2018, he scored his first goal after his return from injury in a 2–2 draw with West Brom. This was his first goal since 2015 and also his first goal under Jürgen Klopp.

=== Southampton ===
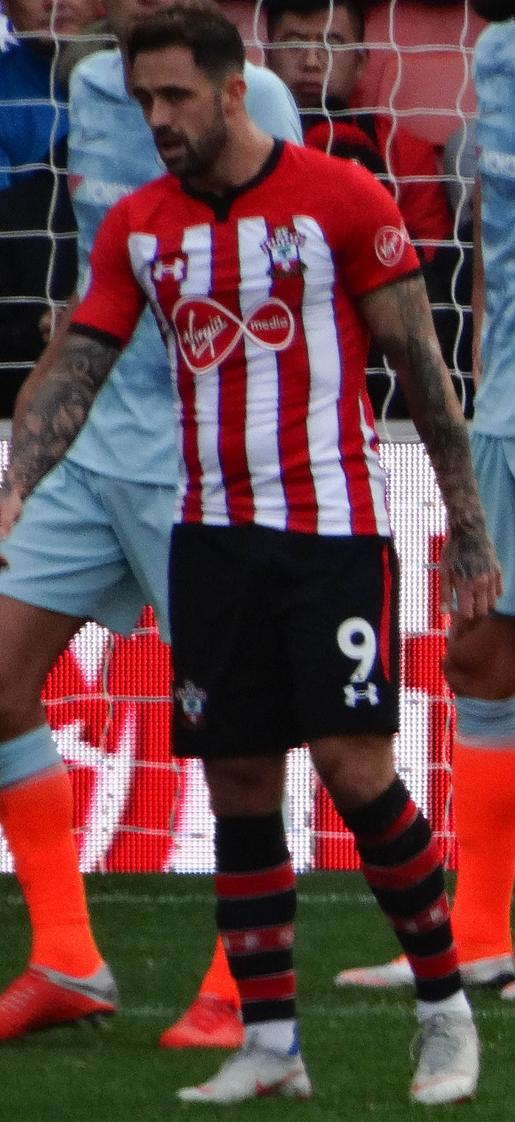
Ings playing for Southampton in 2018

After struggling for playing time in the 2017–18 season due to the form of attackers Roberto Firmino, Mohamed Salah, and Sadio Mané, Ings requested a move away from Liverpool in the summer of 2018. Ings was a popular figure in the dressing room and Jurgen Klopp was reluctant to let him leave in spite of his limited appearances in the previous season. Ings joined Premier League club Southampton on 9 August 2018 on an initial loan until the end of the season, which would become permanent on 1 July 2019, for a reported fee of £18 million, plus a possible further £2 million based on appearances. On 12 August, he made his debut as a second-half substitute in a goalless draw with former club Burnley. He then scored on his first start five days later in a 2–1 defeat to Everton before netting the opening goal in Southampton's 2–0 win over Crystal Palace at the start of the following month, helping the club to their first win of the campaign.

On 16 July 2020, Ings scored his 20th league goal of the 2019–20 season in a 1–1 draw with Brighton & Hove Albion. He became the third player in Southampton history to reach the 20 goal mark in the Premier League following Matt Le Tissier and James Beattie. On 26 July, Ings converted a penalty in Southampton's 3–1 win over Sheffield United on the final day of the league season, taking his final tally for the season to 22 goals in the Premier League, and 25 in all competitions. He finished joint-second in the Premier League Golden Boot race with Arsenal striker Pierre-Emerick Aubameyang, one goal behind Jamie Vardy of Leicester City.

On 4 January 2021, Ings scored his 50th Premier League goal in a 1–0 win over his former club Liverpool. On 14 January, Southampton manager Ralph Hasenhüttl announced that Ings had tested positive for COVID-19. As a result, Ings missed Southampton's 2–0 Premier League defeat to Leicester. After recovering from COVID-19, Ings scored his first goal on 11 February 2021 in the FA Cup 5th round 2–0 win against Wolverhampton Wanderers.

=== Aston Villa ===
Ings signed a three-year contract with Premier League club Aston Villa on 4 August 2021 for an undisclosed fee, reported by BBC Sport to be £25 million. He scored a penalty on his debut on 14 August in a 3–2 away defeat to Watford, and followed this a week later on 21 August with a goal scored from a bicycle kick in a 2–0 home victory against Newcastle United which was also the first goal in front of a full capacity at Villa Park since February 2020. That strike gave Ings Goal of the Month for August. The goal was also voted as Aston Villa's Goal of the Season at their annual End of Season awards.

=== West Ham United ===
On 20 January 2023, Ings signed for fellow Premier League club West Ham United for a fee of £12 million, which would rise to £15 million if West Ham avoided relegation at the end of the season. On 25 February, Ings scored his first goals for West Ham in a win against Nottingham Forest, scoring the first two goals in a 4–0 victory.

On 9 May 2025, West Ham announced that Ings would leave the club at the end of the 2024–25 season.

=== Sheffield United ===
On 27 August 2025, Ings joined Championship club Sheffield United on an initial one-year deal with the option to extend. On 18 May 2026, the club announced the player would leave in the summer once his contract expired.

=== Wycombe Wanderers ===
On 25 September 2026, EFL League One side Wycombe Wanderers announced the signing of Ings as a free agent. His first goal came on his debut with a 90th minute equaliser in a 2–2 draw with Reading on 26 September.

== International career ==
On 3 October 2013, Ings received his first international call-up to the England national under-21 team by manager Gareth Southgate. He made his debut a week later as a substitute in a 4–0 win away to San Marino. He won his second cap in the reverse fixture on 19 November, and scored twice as England won 9–0 against San Marino at the New Meadow. He earned 13 caps and scored four goals for the under-21s from 2013 to 2015.

On 1 October 2015, Ings received his first international call-up to the full England national team from manager Roy Hodgson, for the final UEFA Euro 2016 qualifying matches against Estonia and Lithuania. He made his debut in the latter match on 12 October, replacing Harry Kane after 59 minutes of an eventual 3–0 win in Vilnius.

Ings' second appearance came nearly five years later on 5 September 2020, when he was a 68th-minute substitute in a 1–0 away victory over Iceland in the UEFA Nations League. He scored his first international goal on 8 October, with an overhead kick in a 3–0 friendly win against Wales at Wembley Stadium, his final appearance on the international stage.

== Personal life ==
Off the field, Ings has gained a reputation for charitable acts. In November 2014, he launched and funded the Danny Ings Disability Sport Project to provide football coaching to children with disabilities and learning difficulties after being inspired to do so by a young disabled Burnley fan.

His father, Shayne Ings, initially played as a winger and then as a full-back for Hampshire-based Netley Central Sports. Ings' father still works as a self-employed bricklayer and the family live in the same house in Netley.

== Career statistics ==
=== Club ===
As of match played 7 November 2026

Appearances and goals by club, season and competition
Club	Season	League			FA Cup		League Cup		Other		Total	
Club	Season	Division	Apps	Goals	Apps	Goals	Apps	Goals	Apps	Goals	Apps	Goals
AFC Bournemouth	2009–10	League Two	0	0	0	0	0	0	1 (Note: Appearance in Football League Trophy)	0	1	0
AFC Bournemouth	2010–11	League One	26	7	—		0	0	2 (Note: Appearances in League One play-offs)	1	28	8
AFC Bournemouth	2011–12	League One	1	0	—		0	0	—		1	0
AFC Bournemouth	Total		27	7	0	0	0	0	3	1	30	8
Dorchester Town (loan)	2010–11	Conference South	9	4	2	2	—		2 (Note: One appearance and one goal in FA Trophy, one appearance in Dorset Senior Cup)	1	13	7
Burnley	2011–12	Championship	15	3	0	0	0	0	—		15	3
Burnley	2012–13	Championship	32	3	1	0	0	0	—		33	3
Burnley	2013–14	Championship	40	21	1	1	4	4	—		45	26
Burnley	2014–15	Premier League	35	11	1	0	1	0	—		37	11
Burnley	Total		122	38	3	1	5	4	—		130	43
Liverpool	2015–16	Premier League	6	2	0	0	1	1	2 (Note: Appearances in UEFA Europa League)	0	9	3
Liverpool	2016–17	Premier League	0	0	0	0	2	0	—		2	0
Liverpool	2017–18	Premier League	8	1	1	0	1	0	4 (Note: Appearances in UEFA Champions League)	0	14	1
Liverpool	Total		14	3	1	0	4	1	6	0	25	4
Southampton (loan)	2018–19	Premier League	24	7	0	0	1	1	—		25	8
Southampton	2019–20	Premier League	38	22	2	1	2	2	—		42	25
Southampton	2020–21	Premier League	29	12	3	1	1	0	—		33	13
Southampton	Total		91	41	5	2	4	3	—		100	46
Aston Villa	2021–22	Premier League	30	7	1	0	0	0	—		31	7
Aston Villa	2022–23	Premier League	18	6	1	0	2	1	—		21	7
Aston Villa	Total		48	13	2	0	2	1	—		52	14
West Ham United	2022–23	Premier League	17	2	—		—		5 (Note: Appearances in UEFA Europa Conference League)	1	22	3
West Ham United	2023–24	Premier League	20	1	2	0	2	0	6	0	30	1
West Ham United	2024–25	Premier League	15	1	1	0	1	0	—		17	1
West Ham United	Total		52	4	3	0	3	0	11	1	69	5
Sheffield United	2025–26	Championship	23	2	1	0	—		—		24	2
Wycombe Wanderers	2026–27	League One	2	1	1	0	—		1	0	4	1
Career total			388	113	18	5	18	9	23	3	447	130

=== International ===
Appearances and goals by national team and year
National team	Year	Apps	Goals
England	2015	1	0
England	2020	2	1
Total		3	1

England score listed first, score column indicates score after each Ings goal

List of international goals scored by Danny Ings
No.	Date	Venue	Cap	Opponent	Score	Result	Competition	Ref.
1	8 October 2020	Wembley Stadium, London, England	3	Wales	3–0	3–0	Friendly	

== Honours ==
West Ham United

- UEFA Europa Conference League: 2022–23

Individual

- PFA Fans' Player of the Year: 2013–14 Championship
- PFA Team of the Year: 2013–14 Championship
- Football League Championship Player of the Month: October 2013
- Football League Championship Player of the Year: 2013–14
- Southampton Fans' Player of the Season: 2019–20
