= Fred Turner (footballer) =

English footballer

Personal information
- Full name: Frederick Arthur Turner
- Date of birth: 28 February 1930
- Place of birth: Southampton, England
- Date of death: 9 July 1955 (aged 25)
- Place of death: Southampton, England
- Position: Full back

Youth career
- Bitterne Nomads
- 1948–1950: Southampton

Senior career*
Years	Team	Apps	(Gls)
1950–1955	Southampton	19	(0)
1951–1953	→ Torquay United (loan)	1	(0)
Total		20	(0)
- * Club domestic league appearances and goals

Frederick Arthur Turner (28 February 1930 – 9 July 1955) was an English footballer who played at right back for Southampton in the 1950s, before his death from Stomach Cancer.

== Career ==
Turner was born in Southampton, the son of Mr. W. Turner, a Southampton Football Club director. After playing local league football, he joined the "Saints" as an amateur in July 1948, signing professional papers in February 1950. Although he played regularly for the reserve team, including in the semi-final of the Combination Cup in 1950.

In 1951, he was called up to do his National Service in Devon. During his period in the Army, he was loaned to Torquay United, but only made one appearance before he was demobbed, returning to Southampton in March 1953.

On his return to The Dell, Turner played regularly in the reserves, scoring the occasional goal, and developed into an outstanding full-back. He eventually broke into the first team when he made two appearances in late 1953, replacing Ellerington, before Jack Gregory moved across from the left.

In the following season, Turner's form in the reserves enabled manager George Roughton to move Len Wilkins to centre half, with Turner coming in at right back. After a run of seventeen games, in which his "quiet, thoughtful play" enabled him to establish himself in the side, illness forced him to quit playing in February 1955.

The illness was soon diagnosed as leukemia and Turner died in July 1955, aged 25.
