= Sholing Sports F.C. =

Defunct English football club

- Full name: Sholing Sports Football Club
- Founded: 1901; 125 years ago (as Sholing Athletic)
- Dissolved: 1994; 32 years ago
- Ground: Birch Lawn, Sholing, Southampton
- Capacity: 1,500
Home colours	Away colours

Sholing Sports F.C. were a football team based in Sholing, Southampton from 1901 until 1993 .

They were members of the Wessex League until folding after losing their ground.

== History ==
The club were founded in 1901 as Sholing Athletic and spent their early days playing friendly fixtures until 1908, when they became founder members of the Southampton League.

In 1919–20 Sholing won the Senior League title and the first of three successive Southampton Senior Cups. This saw them step up into the Hampshire League where they won the East Division title. Playing in the County Division (later to become Division 1), Sholing settled and after finishing 6th and 5th they won the Hampshire Senior Cup but after two tough seasons the club finished bottom and returned to the Southampton League.

Now known as simply Sholing the late Thirties were particularly successful times - in 1937–38 they were Senior League champions and Hampshire Intermediate Cup winners, the following season saw them retain the title and win the Southampton Senior Cup.

After World War II the club became known as Sholing Sports and returned to the Hampshire League in 1946 when they were placed in Division 3 East. Back in county football and shortly after moving to their Birch Lawn home, Sholing won promotion as champions in 1952–53 before consolidating themselves in Division 2. Sholing were promoted to Division 1 in 1961-62 but struggled and dropped straight back down again, and were relegated back to Division 3 in 1964–65.

In 1969-70 Sholing Sports were Division 3 East champions and in 1971–72 they finished runners-up in Division 2, winning promotion back to the top flight - and this time they were far better prepared. Sholing became one of the top clubs in the league and began entering the national competitions, the FA Cup and FA Vase. They enjoyed several runs in the latter competition. In 1973–74 Sholing won their first Division 1 title as well as the Hampshire Senior Cup.

The club remained regular title contenders, finishing runners-up three times before the incredible 1982–83 season when they were League champions - and they completed a treble by also winning the Hampshire Senior and Russell Cotes Cup's. The following season saw Sholing retain the league title, but were beaten finalists in the Hampshire Senior Cup. In 1984–85, Sholing were league runners-up and Hampshire Senior Cup finalists, but did gain some compensation when they again won the Russell Cotes Cup.

For the 1986-87 campaign Sholing Sports became founder members of the newly formed Wessex League, and enjoyed a debut season in which they finished 9th. However, in that season's cup competitions they reached the finals of the Southampton Senior, Russell Cotes and the inaugural Wessex League Cup - but lost all three. The early 1990s saw increasing uncertainty over their Birch Lawn ground, caused mainly by financial problems at the adjacent Social Club.

Sholing Sports continued on until August 1993 when they were evicted from their ground prior to the start of the new season and this forced them to withdraw from the competition. The club continued to operate during the 1993–94 season with just an Under 18's side playing in the Hampshire Youth League but the search for a new home ground was unsuccessful and they folded.

== Honours ==
- Wessex League
  - League Cup Finalists 1986/87
- Hampshire League
  - Division 1 Champions 1973/74, 1982/83 and 1983/84, Runners-up 1974/75, 1975/76, 1981/82 and 1984/85
  - Division 2 Runners-up 1970/71
  - East Division Champions 1920/21
  - Division 3 East Champions 1952/53 and 1969/70, Runners-up 1950/51 and 1968/69
- Southampton League
  - Senior Division Champions 1919/20, 1920/21, 1937/38 and 1938/39
  - Junior 'A' Division Champions 1913/14
- Hampshire Football Association
  - Senior Cup Winners 1922/23, 1973/74 and 1982/83, Finalists 1983/84 and 1984/85
  - Intermediate Cup Winners 1937/38
  - Russell Cotes Cup Winners 1971/72, 1982/83 and 1984/85, Finalists 1979/80 and 1986/87
- Southampton Football Association
  - Senior Cup Winners 1919/20, 1920/21, 1921/22, 1938/39, 1961/62 and 1979/80, Finalists 1986/87

== Playing records ==
=== League ===
Season	Division	Position	Significant events
1920/21	Hampshire League East Division	1/9	Champions, promoted
1921/22	Hampshire League County Division	6/16	
1922/23	Hampshire League County Division	5/17	
1923/24	Hampshire League County Division	14/16	
1924/25	Hampshire League County Division	16/16	Relegated, left competition
1925-47	Southampton League		
1947/48	Hampshire League Division 3 East	9/12	
1948/49	Hampshire League Division 3 East	7/14	
1949/50	Hampshire League Division 3 East	4/14	
1950/51	Hampshire League Division 3 East	2/14	Runners-up, not promoted
1951/52	Hampshire League Division 3 East	4/14	
1952/53	Hampshire League Division 3 East	1/14	Champions, promoted
1953/54	Hampshire League Division 2	9/14	
1954/55	Hampshire League Division 2	10/14	
1955/56	Hampshire League Division 2	8/16	
1956/57	Hampshire League Division 2	7/16	
1957/58	Hampshire League Division 2	3/16	
1958/59	Hampshire League Division 2	12/16	
1959/60	Hampshire League Division 2	12/16	
1960/61	Hampshire League Division 2	4/16	
1961/62	Hampshire League Division 2	3/16	Promoted
1962/63	Hampshire League Division 1	16/16	Relegated
1963/64	Hampshire League Division 2	5/16	
1964/65	Hampshire League Division 2	15/16	Relegated
1965/66	Hampshire League Division 3	12/16	
1966/67	Hampshire League Division 3	4/16	
1967/68	Hampshire League Division 3	11/16	
1968/69	Hampshire League Division 3 East	2/14	Runners-up, not promoted
1969/70	Hampshire League Division 3 East	1/14	Champions, promoted
1970/71	Hampshire League Division 2	4/16	
1971/72	Hampshire League Division 2	2/16	Runners-up, promoted
1972/73	Hampshire League Division 1	9/16	
1973/74	Hampshire League Division 1	1/16	Champions
1974/75	Hampshire League Division 1	2/16	Runners-up
1975/76	Hampshire League Division 1	2/16	Runners-up
1976/77	Hampshire League Division 1	6/16	
1977/78	Hampshire League Division 1	11/16	
1978/79	Hampshire League Division 1	7/16	
1979/80	Hampshire League Division 1	3/16	
1980/81	Hampshire League Division 1	3/20	
1981/82	Hampshire League Division 1	2/20	Runners-up
1982/83	Hampshire League Division 1	1/20	Champions
1983/84	Hampshire League Division 1	1/20	Champions
1984/85	Hampshire League Division 1	2/20	Runners-up
1985/86	Hampshire League Division 1	6/20	Left competition
1986/87	Wessex League	9/17	Founder members
1987/88	Wessex League	7/19	
1988/89	Wessex League	15/17	
1989/90	Wessex League	9/19	
1990/91	Wessex League	19/20	
1991/92	Wessex League	15/19	
1992/93	Wessex League	19/21	Left competition

=== FA Cup ===
Season	Round	Opponents	Result
1921/22	Preliminary Round	H v Thornycroft Athletic	W 2-0
	1st Qualifying Round	H v Cowes	W 2-1
	2nd Qualifying Round	H v Harland & Wolff	D 1–1
	Replay	A v Harland & Wolff	L 0-3
1922/23	Preliminary Round	H v Portsmouth Amateurs	D 1-1
	Replay	A v Portsmouth Amateurs	W 3-0
	1st Qualifying Round	A v Thornycrofts (Woolston)	W 3-1
	2nd Qualifying Round	A v Boscombe	L 1–2
1923/24	Preliminary Round	A v Bournemouth Gasworks Athletic	L 1-3
1924/25	Preliminary Round	A v Bournemouth Tramways	L 1-2
1983/84	1st Qualifying Round	H v Salisbury City	W 2–1
	2nd Qualifying Round	H v Gosport Borough	D 0-0
	Replay	A v Gosport Borough	L 0–4
1984/85	1st Qualifying Round	A v Chippenham Town	L 0–3
1985/86	Preliminary Round	A v AFC Totton	L 0–2
1986/87	Preliminary Round	A v Andover	L 0–1
1987/88	1st Qualifying Round	H v Swanage Town & Herston	L 1–3
1988/89	Preliminary Round	A v Devizes Town	L 2–3
1989/90	Preliminary Round	A v Salisbury City	L 0–6
1990/91	Preliminary Round	H v Abingdon United	L 1–3
1991/92	Preliminary Round	H v Maidenhead United	L 0–6
1992/93	Preliminary Round	H v Bemerton Heath Harlequins	L 1–2

=== FA Amateur Cup ===
Season	Round	Opponents	Result
1964/65	Preliminary Round	A v Gosport Borough	L 0-4
1965/66	Preliminary Round	A v Hamworthy	W 2-1
	1st Qualifying Round	A v Netley Sports	L 1-2

=== FA Vase ===
Season	Round	Opponents	Result
1976/77	Preliminary Round	A v Cowes	W 2–0
	Round 1	A v Thatcham Town	L 0–2
1977/78	Preliminary Round	H v Brading Town	W 1–0
	Round 1	H v Newbury Town	L 2–4
1978/79	Preliminary Round	A v Brockenhurst	W 3–1
	Round 1	H v Newbury Town	L 0–1
1979/80	Preliminary Round	A v Fleet Town	L 0–1
1980/81	Preliminary Round	H v Arundel	W 4–0
	Round 1	H v Newbury Town	L 0–1
1979/80	Preliminary Round	A v Fleet Town	L 0–1
1980/81	Preliminary Round	H v Arundel	W 4–0
	Round 1	A v Thatcham Town	W 3–0
	Round 2	H v Dorking	W 3–2
	Round 3	H v Devizes Town	L 1–4
1981/82	Preliminary Round	A v Pirelli General	W 2–1
	Round 1	A v First Tower United	W 1–0
	Round 2	H v Harefield United	W 2–0
	Round 3	A v Whyteleafe	W 1–0
	Round 4	A v Shortwood United	L 0–2
1982/83	Round 1	H v Steyning Town	W 2–1
	Round 2	H v Newbury Town	L 2–3
1983/84	Round 1	A v AFC Totton	W 1–0
	Round 2	H v Eastleigh	L 0–2
1984/85	Round 1	H v Paulton Rovers	W 3–1
	Round 2	H v Mangotsfield United	W 2–1
	Round 3	H v Bristol Manor Farm	L 2–4
1985/86	Round 1	H v Godalming Town	W 2–0
	Round 2	H v Yeading	W 1–0
	Round 3	H v Newport (IOW)	W 3–1
	Round 4	A v Havant Town	L 0–10
1986/87	Round 2	A v Torrington	L 2–3
1987/88	Round 2	A v Wantage Town	W 3–1
	Round 3	A v Vale Recreation	L 1–3
1988/89	Round 2	A v Housnlow	L 0–4
1989/90	Round 1	A v Bournemouth	W 3–1
	Round 2	A v Vale Recreation	L 0–1
1990/91	Round 1	H v First Tower United	W 2–1
	Round 2	H v Trowbridge Town	L 1–2
1991/92	Preliminary Round	H v Swanage Town & Herston	L 1–2
1992/93	Preliminary Round	H v Fleet Town	D 1-1
	Replay	A v Fleet Town	L 1–2

== Ground ==
Sholing Sports played at Birch Lawn, North East Road, Sholing, Southampton which was sold for housing development after their eviction. The ground was fully enclosed with a large stand, covered terrace, floodlights and adjacent to the club house. The record attendance was 800 for the 1983 FA Cup meeting with Gosport Borough.

== Notable players ==
In the early twenties two Sholing Sports players moved on to professional clubs; Tom Parker who progressed on to Southampton and the Arsenal team of the thirties and also Sammy Meston, who played for Southampton, Gillingham and Everton. Locally born Graham Roberts briefly played in the mid-seventies as a teenager before enjoying a lengthy professional career with Tottenham Hotspur, Glasgow Rangers and Chelsea.

Sholing Sports also had several former Southampton professionals as player-managers, including Jack Gregory, Tommy Hare, Mick Earls. and Les Harfield.

== Local rivals ==
With there being so many clubs based on the east side of Southampton, Sholing Sports had a number local rivals - most notably Bitterne Nomads, Vosper Thornycroft, Mullard Sports and especially Netley Central Sports who they frequently met whilst in the Hampshire League. Later years saw a rivalry develop with Folland Sports whilst playing in the Wessex League.

== Successor clubs ==
The club name was revived in 2005 by some locals and the new Sholing Sports joined the Southampton League. There was some initial success, but the venture was short-lived and in 2011 they disbanded.

In 2010, local rivals Vosper Thornycroft changed their name to Sholing FC, but they are not connected in any way.

== Print ==
- Sholing Sports Football Club History by Neil Cotton.
