= Eastleigh Athletic F.C. =

- Eastleigh Athletic in 1911
- Full name: Eastleigh Athletic Football Club
- Nickname: Railwaymen
- Founded: 1891
- Dissolved: 1966
- Ground: Dutton Lane, Eastleigh
Home colours	Away colours

Eastleigh Athletic F.C. were a long-running amateur football club, based in Eastleigh, Hampshire.

== History ==
The Eastleigh Railway Depot was opened by the London & South Western Railway Company in 1891 and shortly afterwards workers formed a football team, initially known as Eastleigh LSWR.

The company owned their own sports ground at Dutton Lane in the town, which over the years was developed with an oval cycling track and grandstand for spectators.

In 1896 the club adopted their best known identity of Eastleigh Athletic and were one of the eight founder members of the Hampshire League, playing in the first ever match - losing 4-5 against Freemantle. Despite this, they finished the inaugural season in 4th place.

The 1897–98 campaign was a memorable one as they were league champions and Hampshire Senior Cup winners, after a 2–1 victory against the 2nd Gordon Highlanders (Aldershot). The final was played at the County Ground, Southampton in front of a large crowd. They also participated in the Western League (Professional Section). Also playing in this eight-team Division were Swindon Town, Reading, Bristol City and Eastville (now Bristol Rovers) - Eastleigh finished in 7th place.

The following season (1898-99) they then joined the Southern League Division 2 (South West Section), finishing 5th out of six clubs, but on the scrapping of this short-lived division the main focus switched back to the more realistic Hampshire League.

In 1903 the league was divided into regional sections with Eastleigh placed in the South Division where they consolidated, however, they still maintained a strong cup pedigree. Eastleigh Athletic were regular entrants in the national competitions and in 1902–03 enjoyed their best run in the FA Cup when they reached the 4th Qualifying Round, losing 1–3 away to Dorset side Whiteheads.

There was further cup glory in 1908–09 when they recorded a fine double by again winning the Hampshire Senior Cup after a 2–0 victory against the 2nd Cameron Highlanders (Tidworth) and also the inaugural Southampton Senior Cup after a 2–0 victory over Bitterne Guild (both games were played at The Dell, Southampton.

The 1910–11 season saw the 'Railwaymen' reach another two finals; the Hampshire Senior Cup was won for the third and final time after a 4–2 success against Kings Royal Rifles Corps (Gosport) at Fratton Park, Portsmouth but they were denied another double after losing the Southampton Senior Cup final 0–3 (in a replay) against Bitterne Guild, who gained revenge for their defeat two years previously.

The club closed down for World War I but reformed once peace resumed. The early twenties saw another two appearances in the Southampton Senior Cup final and the West Division title won in 1922–23. However, in 1925, after a poor season, they opted to join the less demanding Southampton League, where they soon found their feet again as they consecutively won the Junior 3, Junior 2 and South Hants Division titles during the final three seasons of the decade.

In 1930 the club returned to the Hampshire League Division 2 under the name of SR Eastleigh Athletic (S.R. stood for Southern Railway, the new owners of the locomotive works in Eastleigh) and the team soon re-established themselves as they pushed for promotion. After several near misses they were champions in 1938–39 only to have their progress halted by the outbreak of World War II.

After World War II, Eastleigh again returned to the county League in 1947, where they were placed in Division 3 East and when British Rail took over the works two years later their name was amended to BR Eastleigh Athletic.

Disaster struck after when they lost the use of Dutton Lane after the Railway Goods Yard was expanded. This, along with the emergence of other clubs in the town contributed to a gradual decline in their fortunes.

A temporary new home ground was found at nearby Bishopstoke, and after several steady seasons they won promotion in 1956–57 as Division 3 runners-up. However, by the early sixties Eastleigh were playing at Fleming Park (a council owned sports centre still used today) and had to leave the competition in 1961 due to the venue's inadequate facilities.

A year later they were re-admitted back after agreeing a groundshare with neighbours and league rivals BTC Southampton. They were placed in Division 3 but after several seasons of struggle, they were relegated in 1964–65 after finishing bottom. Their fortunes did not improve back in the Southampton League and they folded in August 1966.

A successor club called B.R.S.A. (British Rail Staff Association) later played in both the Eastleigh & District League and the lower junior divisions of the Southampton League before finally calling it a day in 1977.

== Honours ==
=== 1st Team ===
- Hampshire League
  - Division 1 Champions 1897/98
  - Division 2 Champions 1938/39 and Runners-up 1931/32
  - Division 3 Runners-up 1956/57
  - West Division Champions 1922/23
  - South Division Runners-up 1919/20
- Hampshire Football Association
  - Senior Cup Winners 1897/98, 1908/09 and 1910/11
- Southampton League
  - Junior Division 2 Champions 1927/28
  - Junior Division 3 Champions 1926/27
  - South Hants Division Champions 1928/29
- Southampton Football Association
  - Senior Cup Winners 1908/09, Finalists 1910/11, 1919/20 and 1922/23

=== 2nd Team ===
- Hampshire Football Association
  - Junior 'A' Cup Winners 1932/33
- Southampton Football Association
  - Junior 'A' Cup Winners 1929/30
  - Junior Consolation Cup Winners 1929/30

== Playing records ==
=== League ===
Season	Division	Position	Significant events
1896/97	Hampshire League	4/8	Founder Members
1897/98	Western League Professional Section	7/8	Left competition
	Hampshire League	1/8	Champions
1898/99	Southern League Division 2 South & West Section	5/6	Left competition
	Hampshire League	6/8	
1899/1900	Hampshire League	3/8	
1900/01	Hampshire League	5/5	Re-elected
1901/02	Hampshire League	6/7	
1902/03	Hampshire League	3/8	
1903/04	Hampshire League South Division	5/9	
1904/05	Hampshire League South Division	3/9	
1905/06	Hampshire League South Division	4/8	
1906/07	Hampshire League South Division	7/8	
1907/08	Hampshire League South Division	7/10	
1908/09	Hampshire League South Division	5/8	
1909/10	Hampshire League South Division	7/10	
1910/11	Hampshire League South Division	3/9	
1911/12	Hampshire League County Division	6/8	
1912/13	Hampshire League County Division	6/8	
1913/14	Hampshire League County Division	5/8	
1914-19			
1919/20	Hampshire League South Division	2/5	Runners-up, promoted
1920/21	Hampshire League County Division	12/12	Relegated
1921/22	Hampshire League Sectional Division	5/11	Re-organisation
1922/23	Hampshire League West Division	1/10	Champions, promoted
1923/24	Hampshire League County Division	16/16	Withdrew, record expunged
1924/25	Hampshire League East Division	9/9	Left competition
1925-30	Southampton League		
1930/31	Hampshire League Division 2	9/13	
1931/32	Hampshire League Division 2	2/14	Runners-up, not promoted
1932/33	Hampshire League Division 2	7/13	
1933/34	Hampshire League Division 2	5/12	
1934/35	Hampshire League Division 2	3/16	
1935/36	Hampshire League Division 2	4/15	
1936/37	Hampshire League Division 2	5/16	
1937/38	Hampshire League Division 2	3/14	
1938/39	Hampshire League Division 2	1/15	Champions, not promoted
1939-47			
1947/48	Hampshire League Division 3 East	6/12	
1948/49	Hampshire League Division 3 East	8/14	
1949/50	Hampshire League Division 3 East	12/14	
1950/51	Hampshire League Division 3 East	9/14	
1951/52	Hampshire League Division 3 East	10/14	
1952/53	Hampshire League Division 3 East	13/14	Re-elected
1953/54	Hampshire League Division 3 East	6/14	
1954/55	Hampshire League Division 3 East	8/11	
1955/56	Hampshire League Division 3 East	10/16	
1956/57	Hampshire League Division 3	2/16	Runners-up, promoted
1957/58	Hampshire League Division 2	10/16	
1958/59	Hampshire League Division 2	7/16	
1959/60	Hampshire League Division 2	6/16	
1960/61	Hampshire League Division 2	9/16	Left competition
1961/62	Southampton League		
1962/63	Hampshire League Division 3	14/16	
1963/64	Hampshire League Division 3	14/16	
1964/65	Hampshire League Division 3	16/16	Left competition
1965/66	Southampton League		Folded

=== FA Cup ===
Season	Round	Opponents	Result
1895/96	1st Qualifying Round	H v Clifton	W 9–0
	2nd Qualifying Round	A v Reading	L 1–2
1896/97	1st Qualifying Round	H v Royal Artillery Portsmouth	L 1–7
1897/98	1st Qualifying Round	A v Oxford Cygnets	W 6–2
	2nd Qualifying Round	A v Reading Amateurs	W 4–1
	3rd Qualifying Round	A v Eastville Rovers	L 0–2
1898/99	Preliminary Round	A v Staple Hill	L 1-2
1899/1900	2nd Qualifying Round	H v Freemantle	W 5-0
	3rd Qualifying Round	A v Bristol Rovers	L 0-5
1901/02	1st Qualifying Round	H v Freemantle	L 0-3
1902/03	1st Qualifying Round	A v Basingstoke Town	W 2–0
	2nd Qualifying Round	A v North Hants Ironworks	D 2-2
	Replay	H v North Hants Ironworks	W 3–0
	3rd Qualifying Round	H v Staplehill	W 7–0
	4th Qualifying Round	A v Whiteheads	L 1–3
1903/04	1st Qualifying Round	A v Freemantle	L 0-2
1904/05	3rd Qualifying Round	H v Cowes	D 3-3
	replay	A v Cowes	L 1-3
1905/06	1st Qualifying Round	A v Ryde Sports	W 2-1
	2nd Qualifying Round	A v Cowes	L 1-2
1906/07	1st Qualifying Round	A v Winchester City	W 4–2
	2nd Qualifying Round	H v Cowes	L 0-1
1907/08	1st Qualifying Round	A v Cowes	W 1-0
	2nd Qualifying Round	A v Ryde Sports	W 5-1
	3rd Qualifying Round	H v Salisbury City	L 1-3
1908/09	1st Qualifying Round	H v Bitterne Guild	L 2-5
1909/10	1st Qualifying Round	H v Royal Engineers (Aldershot)	L 0-1
1910/11	1st Qualifying Round	H v Salisbury City	W 2-0
	2nd Qualifying Round	H v Royal Engineers (Aldershot)	L 1-2
1911/12	1st Qualifying Round	H v Southampton Cambridge	W 10-1
	2nd Qualifying Round	H v Bitterne Guild	L 1-3
1912/13	Preliminary Round	H v Poole Town	W 4-0
	1st Qualifying Round	H v Basingstoke Town	L 2-4
1913/14	Preliminary Round	A v Weymouth	D 2-2
	Replay	H v Weymouth	W 2-0
	1st Qualifying Round	H v Christchurch	W 5-1
	2nd Qualifying Round	A v Gosport United	L 1-2
1914/15	1st Qualifying Round	H v Thornycroft Athletic	L 4-8
1919/20	Preliminary Round	H v Basingstoke Town	L 0-2
1921/22	Extra-Preliminary Round	A v Thornycroft Athletic	L 1-3
1922/23	Extra-Preliminary Round	H v Portsmouth Amateurs	L 1-4
1923/24	Preliminary Round	A v Bournemouth	D 0-0
	Replay	H v Bournemouth	W 3-2
	1st Qualifying Round	A v Bournemouth Tramways	L 2-4

=== FA Amateur Cup ===
Season	Round	Opponents	Result
1934/35	1st Qualifying Round	A v Hamworthy	W 4-1
	2nd Qualifying Round	H v Ryde Sports	W 2-1
	3rd Qualifying Round	A v Winchester City	W 3-2
	4th Qualifying Round	A v HMS Victory	L 0-2
1935/36	1st Qualifying Round	H v Ringwood Town	W 6-0
	2nd Qualifying Round	A v Portsmouth Gas Company	L 1-4

== Ground ==
For many years, Eastleigh Athletic played at Dutton Road in Eastleigh but were forced to leave when the railway yard was expanded after World War II. They then spent the Fifties playing on a pitch at Chickenhall Lane, Bishopstoke but after losing the ground they had a rather nomadic existence which eventually contributed to their demise.

== Notable players ==
During their long history, the club had many fine players - all of whom also worked at the site. The best known of these is Terry Paine, who went on to enjoy a long professional career with Southampton and becoming an England international.

- See Eastleigh Athletic players for full list.

== Local rivalries ==
With there being so many teams in the area, Eastleigh Athletic had a number of local rivals. These included Swaythling Athletic, Pirelli General and Eastleigh Spartans, who they once nearly merged with. They also ground shared with neighbours BTC Southampton and Ford Sports.
