= Hampshire Senior Cup =

- Founded: 1887
- Region: Hampshire, Isle of Wight, Dorset, Wiltshire, Channel Islands
- Teams: varies
- Current champions: Basingstoke Town (9 titles)
- Most championships: Southampton (17 titles)
- Website: Hampshire Senior Cup

The Hampshire Senior Cup is a cup competition open to football teams affiliated with the Hampshire Football Association. The competition was founded in 1887 and has been contested every year since, except 1914 to 1919 when it was postponed due to the First World War.

Despite the name, teams from Wiltshire, Dorset, the Isle of Wight and the Channel Islands have also competed in this competition, as well as teams representing the Police and any armed forces based within the county. The competition is open to teams from all levels of competition from the Premier League down to Level 10 of the English football league system, and a number of league teams have won this competition in the past. However, it is mostly non-league clubs who compete for this trophy instead of their league counterparts as all teams associated with the Hampshire FA are required to compete, with the exception of Premier League and English Football League teams who may opt out of the competition for a nominal fee.

The record attendance came in the 1932 Final, when an incredible 20,544 watched Newport play Cowes at The Dell, Southampton. The biggest score in the final came more recently in 2000 when Aldershot Town defeated Andover 9–1. There has also twice been 8–0 final scores.

In April 2012, FIFA announced that the Hawk-Eye sensor system would be used in an experimental capacity at that year's final between A.F.C. Totton and Eastleigh as part of a series of ongoing reliability and accuracy tests of goal-line technology systems.

On 9 October 2013, a tie was played between Brockenhurst and Andover Town. After the match finished 0-0 after extra time, the subsequent penalty shootout resulted in 29 consecutive goals being scored, with Brockenhurst winning 15–14. This was later confirmed by the Football Association as an English record (and possibly a world record) for the highest number of consecutive goals scored in a penalty shootout.

== Winners ==
=== By team ===
Victories	Team	First win	Last win	Notes
17	Southampton	1891	1976	Includes wins as St. Mary's, Southampton St. Mary's and wins by 'A' and reserve teams. Includes one as Joint winners in 1907
9	Basingstoke Town	1971	2026	
9	Cowes Sports	1897	1967	
9	Havant & Waterlooville	1970	2019	Includes wins by Havant Town and Waterlooville
8	Farnborough	1975	2022	Includes wins as Farnborough Town
8	Newport (IOW)	1932	1998	
6	Aldershot Town	1928	2007	Includes one win by Aldershot
6	Ryde Sports	1900	1939	Includes one as joint winners in 1936
5	Andover	1949	2001	
4	AFC Bournemouth	1924	2020	Includes wins as Bournemouth & Boscombe, and by 'A' and Reserve teams
4	Alton Town	1958	1978	
4	Fareham Town	1957	1993	
4	Portsmouth	1903	1987	Includes wins by 'A' and Reserve teams
3	Eastleigh Athletic	1898	1911	
3	Royal Engineers (Aldershot)	1889	1894	
3	Sholing Sports	1923	1983	Includes one win as Sholing Athletic
3	Southampton Police	1942	1945	
2	AFC Totton	2010	2011	
2	Bournemouth Gasworks Athletic	1953	1954	
2	Gosport Borough	1988	2015	
2	RAOC (Hilsea)	1929	1947	
2	RASC (Aldershot)	1936	1938	Includes one as joint winners in 1936
2	RAMC (Crookham)	1925	1960	Includes one as RAMC (Aldershot)
2	Salisbury City	1962	1964	
2	Winchester City	1931	2005	
1	AFC Stoneham	2025	2025	
1	Alresford Town	2013	2013	
1	Eastleigh	2012	2012	
1	Fleet Town	2009	2009	
1	Folland Aircraft	1941	1941	
1	Freemantle	1893	1893	
1	Pirelli General	1977	1977	
1	AFC Portchester	2024	2024	
1	RMLI (Gosport)	1922	1922	
1	Romsey Town	1979	1979	
1	Royal Artillery Portsmouth	1896	1896	
1	Woolston Works	1888	1888	
1	2nd Grenadier Guards	1907	1907	Joint Winners in 1907
1	3rd Royal Marines (Southampton)	1943	1943	

=== By year ===
Year	Winner	Final Result	Runner-up	Venue of final
1888	Woolston Works	2–0	Winchester	County Ground, Southampton
1889	Royal Engineers (Aldershot)	5–1	Portsmouth FA	County Ground, Southampton
1890	Royal Engineers (Aldershot)	3–2	King's Royal Rifles	County Ground, Southampton
1891	St. Mary's	3–1	Royal Engineers (Aldershot)	County Ground, Southampton
1892	St. Mary's	5–0	Medical Staff Corps (Aldershot)	County Ground, Southampton
1893	Freemantle	2–1	St. Mary's	County Ground, Southampton
1894	Royal Engineers (Aldershot)	1–0	St. Mary's	County Ground, Southampton
1895	Southampton St. Mary's	5–0	15th Company Royal Artillery (Fareham)	County Ground, Southampton
1896	Royal Artillery Portsmouth	3–1	Southampton St. Mary's	County Ground, Southampton
1897	Cowes	1–1	2nd Gordon Highlanders (Aldershot)	County Ground, Southampton
	Cowes	2–1	2nd Gordon Highlanders (Aldershot)	County Ground, Southampton
1898	Eastleigh Athletic	2–1	2nd Gordon Highlanders (Aldershot)	County Ground, Southampton
1899	Southampton Reserves	2–2	Ryde	United Services Ground, Portsmouth
	Southampton Reserves	2–0	Ryde	Portsmouth (Uncertain Ground)
1900	Ryde	1–0	Portsmouth Reserves	United Services Ground, Portsmouth
1901	Southampton Reserves	2–0	Ryde	Fratton Park, Portsmouth
1902	Southampton Reserves	2–0	Ryde	Fratton Park, Portsmouth
1903	Portsmouth Reserves	0–0	Southampton Reserves	Freemantle Football Ground, Southampton
	Portsmouth Reserves	1–0	Southampton Reserves	Freemantle Football Ground, Southampton
1904	Ryde Sports	1–0	Portsmouth Reserves	The Dell, Southampton
1905	Southampton Reserves	2–0	Portsmouth Reserves	The Dell, Southampton
1906	Cowes	5–1	HMS Excellent (Portsmouth)	The Dell, Southampton
1907	Southampton Reserves	1–1	2nd Grenadier Guards	Fratton Park, Portsmouth
	Southampton Reserves	1–1	2nd Grenadier Guards	Fratton Park, Portsmouth
	2nd Grenadier Guards and Southampton (joint holders)			
1908	Southampton Reserves	1–0	RMLI (Gosport)	Fratton Park, Portsmouth
1909	Eastleigh Athletic	2–0	2nd Cameron Highlanders (Tidworth)	The Dell, Southampton
1910	Southampton Reserves	5–2	RAMC (Aldershot)	Fratton Park, Portsmouth
1911	Eastleigh Athletic	4–2	Kings Royal Rifles Corps (Gosport)	Fratton Park, Portsmouth
1912	Cowes	1–1	Southampton Reserves	Fratton Park, Portsmouth
	Cowes	1–0	Southampton Reserves	Fratton Park, Portsmouth
1913	Portsmouth Reserves	4–1	Bournemouth	The Dell, Southampton
1914	Southampton Reserves	4–0	Royal Engineers (Aldershot)	Dean Court, Bournemouth
1915–1919	No Competition owing to war			
1920	Southampton Reserves			
1921	Southampton Reserves		Thornycroft Athletic	
1922	RMLI (Gosport)		Bournemouth	
1923	Sholing Athletic	4–2	Thornycrofts (Woolston)	The Dell, Southampton
1924	Bournemouth & Boscombe Athletic			
1925	RAMC (Aldershot)	4–2	Cowes	The Dell, Southampton
1926	Cowes	3–1	Ryde Sports	The Dell, Southampton
1927	Ryde Sports		Cowes	The Dell, Southampton
1928	Aldershot			
1929	RAOC (Hilsea)			The Dell, Southampton
1930	Cowes	3–0	Royal Marines Portsmouth	The Dell, Southampton
1931	Winchester City	4–2	Andover	The Dell, Southampton
1932	Newport	2–1	Cowes	The Dell, Southampton
1933	Newport	3–2	Andover	The Dell, Southampton
1934	Cowes		RASC (Aldershot)	The Dell, Southampton
1935	Southampton 'A'		Bournemouth & Boscombe Athletic	The Dell, Southampton
1936	RASC (Aldershot)		Ryde Sports	The Dell, Southampton
	RASC (Aldershot)		Ryde Sports	The Dell, Southampton
	RASC (Aldershot)		Ryde Sports	The Dell, Southampton
RASC (Aldershot) & Ryde Sports (joint holders)
1937	Ryde Sports		2nd Kings Own Royal Regiment	The Dell, Southampton
1938	RASC (Aldershot)		Southampton 'A'	The Dell, Southampton
1939	Ryde Sports		Portsmouth Gas Company	The Dell, Southampton
1940	Southampton Reserves			
1941	Folland Aircraft		Royal Marines Portsmouth	Fratton Park, Portsmouth
1942	Southampton Police	3–1	Folland Aircraft	
1943	3rd Royal Marines (Southampton)		Cunliffe Owen	The Dell, Southampton
1944	Southampton Police	1–0	Royal Marines Portsmouth	Fratton Park, Portsmouth
1945	Southampton Police			
1946	Cowes	2–1 aet	Bournemouth Gasworks	The Dell, Southampton
1947	RAOC (Hilsea)			
1948	Cowes	2–1 aet	RAMC (Aldershot)	The Dell, Southampton
1949	Andover	2–1	Romsey Town	The Dell, Southampton
1950	Southampton 'A'	4–1	Cowes	The Dell, Southampton
1951	Andover	4–1	Newport	The Dell, Southampton
1952	Portsmouth 'A'		RAMC (Crookham)	The Dell, Southampton
1953	Bournemouth Gasworks	4–3	Newport	The Dell, Southampton
1954	Bournemouth Gasworks	2–1	Cowes	The Dell, Southampton
1955	Newport	2–0	Southampton 'A'	The Dell, Southampton
1956	Andover	4–3	Cowes Sports	The Dell, Southampton
1957	Fareham Town	2–0	Andover	The Dell, Southampton
1958	Alton Town		Cowes Sports	
1959	Bournemouth & Boscombe 'A'	1–0 aet	Portsmouth 'A'	Dean Court, Bournemouth
1960	RAMC (Crookham)		Fareham Town	The Dell, Southampton
1961	Newport			
1962	Salisbury		Fareham Town	The Dell, Southampton
1963	Fareham Town			
1964	Salisbury	3–0	Aldershot	The Dell, Southampton
1965	Andover	8–0	Basingstoke Town	The Dell, Southampton
1966	Newport	3–2 aet	Alton Town	Fratton Park, Portsmouth
1967	Cowes	2–1	Newport	Partlands, Ryde
1968	Fareham Town	2–1	Hawker-Siddeley	Fratton Park, Portsmouth
1969	Alton Town	2–1	Pirelli General	Walled Meadow, Andover
1970	Waterlooville	3–1	Gosport Borough	Fratton Park, Portsmouth
1971	Basingstoke Town	1-1	Fareham Town	Fratton Park, Portsmouth
	Basingstoke Town	3–2	Fareham Town	(Replay)
1972	Alton Town	1–0	Brockenhurst	
1973	Waterlooville		Newport	The Dell, Southampton
1974	Sholing Sports	2–1	Waterlooville	The Dell, Southampton
1975	Farnborough Town	5–1 aet	Basingstoke Town	
1976	Southampton 'A'	2–0	Waterlooville	The Dell, Southampton
1977	Pirelli General	1–0	Farnborough Town	Recreation Ground (Aldershot)
1978	Alton Town		Pirelli General	The Dell, Southampton
1979	Romsey Town	1–0	Farnborough Town	The Dell, Southampton
1980	Newport	2–2 aet	Farnborough Town	The Dell, Southampton
	Newport	1–0	Farnborough Town	Cams Alders, Fareham (Replay)
1981	Newport	2–0	Havant Town	The Dell, Southampton
1982	Farnborough Town	2–0	Basingstoke Town	The Dell, Southampton
1983	Sholing Sports	3–1	East Cowes Victoria Athletic	The Dell, Southampton
1984	Farnborough Town	2–2	Sholing Sports	The Dell, Southampton
	Farnborough Town	3–1	Sholing Sports	Cams Alders, Fareham
1985	Waterlooville	2–1	Sholing Sports	The Dell, Southampton
1986	Farnborough Town	2–0	Basingstoke Town	The Dell, Southampton
1987	Portsmouth Reserves	2–0	Road-Sea Southampton	Fratton Park, Portsmouth
1988	Gosport Borough	3–0	Farnborough Town	The Dell, Southampton
1989	AFC Bournemouth Reserves	2–1	Basingstoke Town	Dean Court, Bournemouth
1990	Basingstoke Town	8–0	AFC Lymington	The Dell, Southampton
1991	Farnborough Town	1–0	Waterlooville	Fratton Park, Portsmouth
1992	Waterlooville	1–0	Havant Town	Fratton Park, Portsmouth
1993	Fareham Town	4–1	Farnborough Town	The Dell, Southampton
1994	Havant Town	1–0	Farnborough Town	The Dell, Southampton
1995	Havant Town	1–0	Farnborough Town	Fratton Park, Portsmouth
1996	Basingstoke Town	2–0	Waterlooville	The Dell, Southampton
1997	Basingstoke Town	2–0	Waterlooville	The Dell, Southampton
1998	Newport	2–1	Fareham Town	The Dell, Southampton
1999	Aldershot Town	1–0	Basingstoke Town	The Dell, Southampton
2000	Aldershot Town	9–1	Andover	Camrose Ground, Basingstoke
2001	Andover	2–0	Havant & Waterlooville	The Dell, Southampton
2002	Aldershot Town	3–1	Havant & Waterlooville	St Mary's Stadium, Southampton
2003	Aldershot Town	2–1	Bashley	St Mary's Stadium, Southampton
2004	Farnborough Town	2–1	Fareham Town	St Mary's Stadium, Southampton
2005	Winchester City	2–1	Aldershot Town	Dean Court, Bournemouth
2006	Farnborough Town	1–0	Basingstoke Town	Dean Court, Bournemouth
2007	Aldershot Town	2–1	Fleet Town	Dean Court, Bournemouth
2008	Basingstoke Town	1–0	Farnborough	Dean Court, Bournemouth
2009	Fleet Town	1–0	VT F.C.	St Mary's Stadium, Southampton
2010	AFC Totton	4–0	Aldershot Town	Dean Court, Bournemouth
2011	AFC Totton	3–1	Sholing	St Mary's Stadium, Southampton
2012	Eastleigh	2–0	AFC Totton	St Mary's Stadium, Southampton
2013	Alresford Town	3–2	AFC Bournemouth	Dean Court, Bournemouth
2014	Basingstoke Town	3–2 aet	Havant & Waterlooville	Fratton Park, Portsmouth
2015	Gosport Borough	3–0	Sholing	Fratton Park, Portsmouth
2016	Havant & Waterlooville	1–1 (5–3 pens)	Winchester City	St Mary's Stadium, Southampton
2017	Basingstoke Town	0–0 (7–6 pens)	AFC Bournemouth	St Mary's Stadium, Southampton
2018	Havant & Waterlooville	3–0	Blackfield & Langley	St Mary's Stadium, Southampton
2019	Havant & Waterlooville	2–1	Basingstoke Town	Ten Acres, Eastleigh
2020	AFC Bournemouth	2-2 (5–3 pens)	Eastleigh	Snows Stadium, Totton
2022	Farnborough	2–2 (4-1 pens)	Eastleigh	Ten Acres, Eastleigh
2023	Basingstoke Town	1–0	AFC Bournemouth	Fratton Park, Portsmouth
2024	AFC Portchester	0–0 (5-4 pens)	AFC Totton	Recreation Ground (Aldershot)
2025	AFC Stoneham	3-0	AFC Portchester	Snows Stadium, Totton
2026	Basingstoke Town	2-0	Sholing	Snows Stadium, Totton
