= Sholing F.C. =

English football club

Coordinates: 50°53′36″N 1°20′17″W

Sholing
- Full name: Sholing Football Club
- Nickname: The Boatmen
- Founded: 1960; 66 years ago
- Ground: The Charters Stadium, Sholing
- Capacity: 2,500
- Chairman: Mick Budny
- Manager: Ross White
- League: Southern League Premier Division South
- 2025–26: Southern League Premier Division South, 6th of 22
Home colours	Away colours

Sholing Football Club is an English football club based in Sholing, Southampton, Hampshire. Formerly known as Vosper Thornycroft FC and later VTFC the club changed its name in 2010 to Sholing FC. In 2013–14, they won both the FA Vase and the Wessex League Premier Division and have three times been runners up in the Wessex Premier, in 2007, 2009, and 2016. They are currently members of the Southern League Premier Division South. The club has twice won the Hampshire League, in 2001 and 2004. Sholing are also eight times Southampton Senior Cup Winners.

== History ==
=== Vosper Thornycroft FC ===
Sholing FC have a long fragmented history. They were re-formed in 1960 as Thornycrofts (Woolston) - successors to the previous club which had folded several years earlier, although teams from the Woolston Works had competed as early as 1878 under various names. During one remarkable season in 1920, they held Burnley to a 0–0 draw in the FA Cup, losing the replay 0-5.

In its post-1960 incarnation, they initially played in the Southampton League - becoming Vosper Thornycroft in 1970. After a number of successful years, they were promoted to the Hampshire League Third Division in 1991, rising to the Second Division the following season, followed by the First Division in 1998. A year later, the club was relegated when the competition was re-organised, but at their first attempt, they won promotion to the new Premier Division.

In 2003, Vospers were renamed as VT FC, after their parent company, and in their first season under their new name, they were champions and won promotion to the Wessex League. After winning the Wessex League Cup in 2005, VTFC were league runners-up in 2008 and 2009. VTFC arrived in the Southern League Division One South and West for the 2009–10 season when they finished 4th. They lost in the subsequent play-offs to AFC Totton and the Southern League Cup to Cambridge City.

=== Sholing F.C. ===
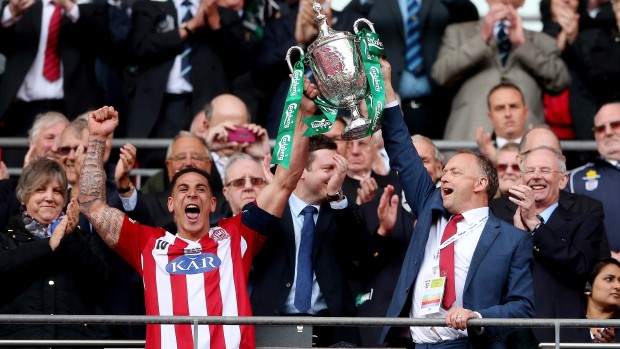
Sholing won the FA Vase in 2014.

In June 2010, the club changed its name to Sholing F.C. as the parent company VT Group no longer existed. The change also reflected the district of Southampton in which the club is based.

After four years in the Southern League Division One South and West, where they finished runners-up in 2011 and reached the play-offs in all four of those campaigns, the club resigned from the Southern League in 2013 for financial reasons and stepped back into the Wessex League Premier Division.

During the 2013–14 season, Sholing won the FA Vase for the first time in their history, beating West Auckland Town in the final at Wembley Stadium, with Marvin McLean scoring the only goal in the game in the 71st minute.

They also finished as champions of the Wessex League Premier Division and secured promotion back to the Southern League for 2014–15.

Three players retired after the Wembley final and three more moved to other clubs in higher leagues, so 2014–15 was going to be a transition season. The club finished 17th and reached the final of the Hampshire Senior Cup, losing 3–0 to Gosport Borough. At the end of the season, it was revealed that the club's ground did not meet the new FA Step 4 grading criteria and once again Sholing were placed in the Wessex League for 2015–16.

Sholing finished as runners-up to Salisbury in the Wessex League Premier Division 2015–16. The Boatmen won 10 of their last 11 games to pip Blackfield & Andover to second place. Dan Mason finished as club top scorer with 39 goals, placing him second in the League golden boot competition.

The Boatmen achieved two cup wins in the space of three days at the end of the 2016–17 season, firstly winning the Wessex League Cup, beating Baffins Milton Rovers 2–1, then lifting the Southampton Senior Cup with a 3–1 victory over Team Solent at St Mary's Stadium. In the Wessex Premier Division, they finished 3rd.

Sholing, once again, finished in 3rd place in the Wessex Premier Division in the 2017–18 season. Despite the runners up, Andover Town, declining promotion, Sholing's Points Per Game (PPG) was less than other clubs in Step 5, so the club was not offered promotion by the FA. The following season, however, the club won the Wessex League championship. During the course of the season, manager Dave Diaper reached the milestone of 1000 games in charge of the team.

The Boatmen currently play in the Southern League Premier Division, following a play-off win over Hamworthy United in 2022–23. Manager Dave Diaper stepped down in October 2023 after 25 years at the helm and 1,210 matches with Paul Doswell taking charge in the dugout, assisted by Ross White and Ian Baird. Sholing finished the 2024-25 season in 11th place, having doubled the average attendance to over 500.

Sholing narrowly missed out on the play-offs during the 2025-26 season, finishing 6th. Ross White took over as first team manager, with Paul Doswell becoming Director of Football. Joey Jones joined the club as player/coach early in the 2026-27 season.

== Ground ==
Sholing play their home games at The Mortgage Decisions Stadium. The ground has covered seating for 324 spectators and covered terracing for 430. A new 400 capacity stand was opened for the start of the 2024–25 season by Levi Colwill and Matthew Le Tissier. In the summer of 2025, a 3G pitch was installed along with further ground improvements. The board took ownership of the freehold of the stadium and associated land in 2026, securing the long term future of the club. An office building and 6 padel courts gained planning permission, with work starting in September 2026.

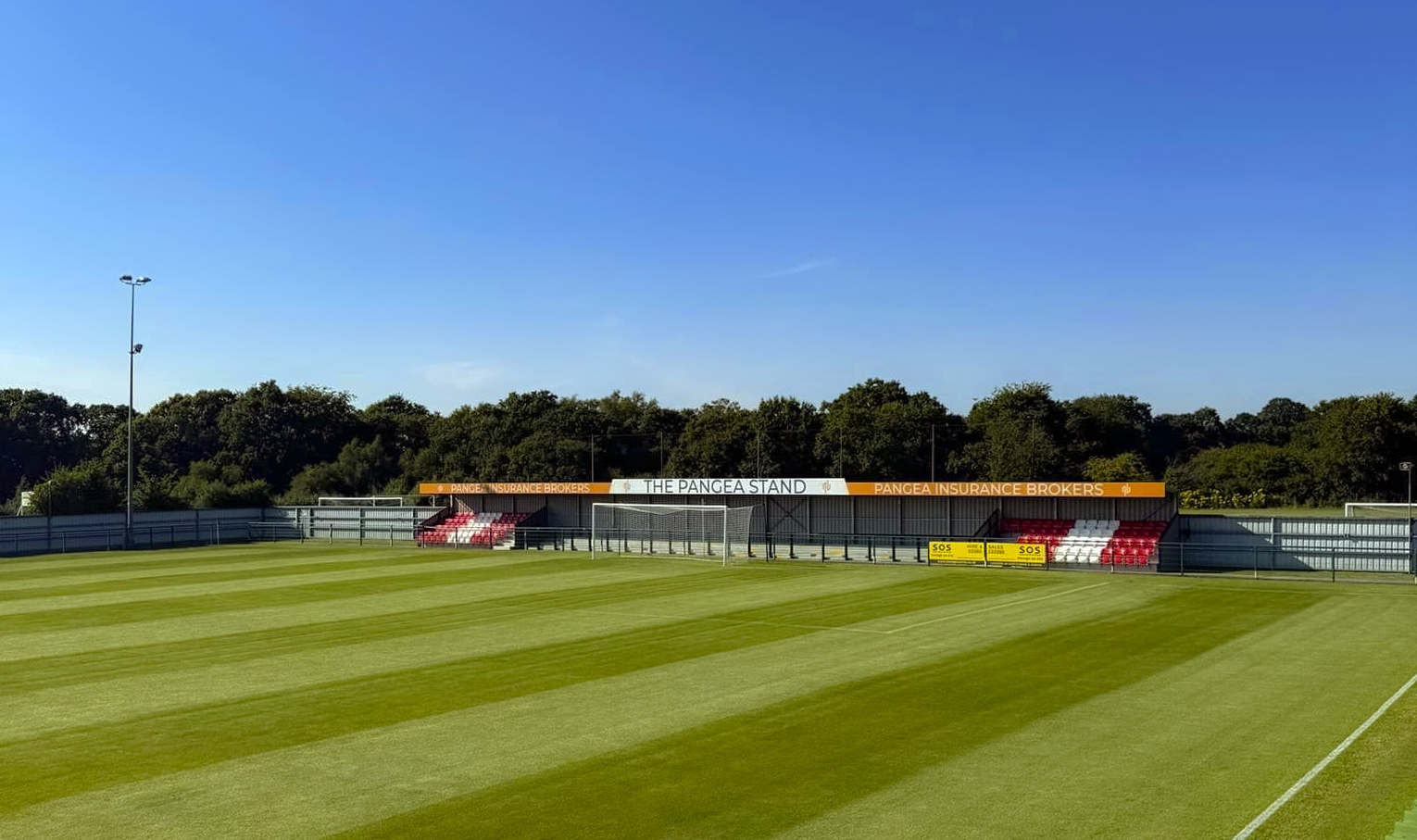
Pangea Stand at The Mortgage Decisions Stadium, home of Sholing Football Club

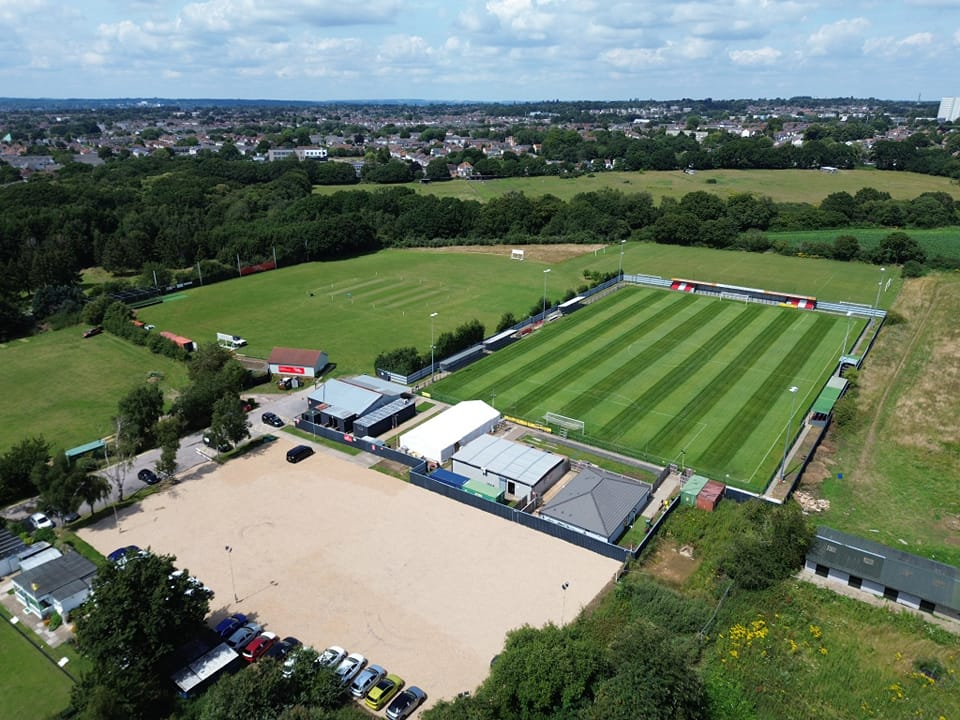
Aerial photograph of The Mortgage Decisions Stadium, home of Sholing Football Club

== Current squad ==
As of 12 October 2026

Note: Flags indicate national team as defined under FIFA eligibility rules; some limited exceptions apply. Players may hold more than one non-FIFA nationality.

No.	Pos.	Nation	Player
1	GK	ENG	Jack Turner
2	MF	ENG	Brad Targett
3	DF	ENG	Joe Rabbetts
4	MF	ENG	Olly Pendlebury
5	DF	MLT	Sam Magri
6	DF	ENG	Harry Taylor
7	MF	ENG	Jake McCarthy
8	DF	ENG	Byron Mason (captain)
9	FW	ENG	Daniel Mason
10	FW	ENG	Tommy Willard
11	MF	ENG	Jack Saunders
14	DF	ENG	Eoin Bolger

No.	Pos.	Nation	Player
15	FW	ENG	Jonas Mukuna
16	MF	ENG	Reece Wylie
17	MF	WAL	Dan Jones
18	FW	ENG	Jahiem Dotse (on loan from Wycombe Wanderers)
19	FW	ENG	Michael Folivi
20	FW	ENG	Tommy-Lee Higgs
21	MF	ENG	Jonathon Page
22	MF	NIR	Joey Jones (player-coach)
23	FW	ENG	Josh Phillips
24	DF	ENG	Thabo Kuaho (on loan from Walton & Hersham)
—	FW	UKR	Kristian Shevchenko

=== Out on loan ===
Note: Flags indicate national team as defined under FIFA eligibility rules; some limited exceptions apply. Players may hold more than one non-FIFA nationality.

No.	Pos.	Nation	Player
12	FW	ENG	Vinnie Tume (at Merstham until 9 November 2026)

== Honours ==
- FA Vase
  - Winners: 2013–14
- Southern League Division One South & West
  - Runners-up: 2010–11
- Wessex League Premier Division
  - Champions: 2013–14, 2018–19
  - Runners-up: 2007–08, 2008–09, 2015–16
- Hampshire Premier League
  - Champions: 2000–01, 2003–04
- Wessex League Cup
  - Winners: 2004–05, 2016–17
- Hampshire Senior Cup
  - Runners-up: 2008–09, 2010–11, 2014–15
- Southampton Senior Cup
  - Winners: 2001–02, 2003–04, 2005–06, 2006–07, 2007–08, 2009–10, 2013–14, 2016–17
- Russell Cotes Cup (Hampshire FA Benevolent Cup)
  - Winners: 2019–20, 2020–21

== Club records ==
- Best League performance: Southern League Premier Division South 6th - 2025–26
- Best FA Cup performance: 1st Round - 2026-27
- Best FA Trophy performance: 1st Round - 2019–20, 2026-27
- Best FA Vase performance: Winners - 2013–14
- Record attendance : 1,888 ( v Chelsea U19, 26 July 2025 )
- Record league attendance : 1,005 ( v AFC Totton, 13 August 2024 )
- Appearances : Marvin McLean, 801
- Goalscorer : Dan Mason, 306
