= Hampshire League =

- Founded: 1896-2004
- Folded: 2004
- Country: England
- Feeder to: Wessex League
- Relegation to: Southampton League; Portsmouth League; Bournemouth League; Isle of Wight League; North Hants League; Aldershot League
- Domestic cup: FA Cup; FA Vase; Hampshire Senior Cup; Hampshire Intermediate Cup; Local Divisional FA Senior Cups

The Hampshire League was a long running amateur football league in Hampshire, England.

The competition ran for 108 years, until it was absorbed the expanding Wessex League in 2004. It has since been succeeded by the Hampshire Premier League with a recognised place on the FA Pyramid system.

== History ==
The Hampshire Football League was formed in 1896 to provide an organised fixture schedule for clubs within the county.

The inaugural campaign saw eight teams taking part with the first ever fixture being played on Saturday 5th September 1896 between Eastleigh Athletic and Freemantle, who won a thrilling match 5–4 with a player called Inglefield scoring the first ever goal! The first-ever league champions were Cowes.

Originally administered by the Hampshire Football Association, the fledgling competition was initially split into regional sections with an end of season play off to decide the champions, but numbers grew and eventually the league formed three larger divisions with straight forward promotion/relegation.

The post-war era saw the Hampshire League at its prime, consisting of many strong clubs destined to later progress further up the pyramid whilst the Reserve and ‘A’ sides of Southampton, Portsmouth, Bournemouth, Reading and Aldershot also took part for many years. The strength of the league was well indicated by the performances of its clubs in national cup competitions.

By 1986, most of the top clubs had become semi-professional and left to join the newly formed Wessex League. Along with their Dorset and Wiltshire counterparts, the Hampshire League became a feeder in a revised pyramid system.

To keep pace with the modern ground grading criteria, in 1999 the top-flight was renamed as the Premier Division, for which only clubs with the required facilities were allowed entry. In 2004 it was agreed to dissolve the competition and become part of the expanding Wessex League. Vosper Thornycroft were the last champions.

== Successor competitions ==
- See Hampshire League 2004
- See Hampshire Premier League

== League champions ==
Season	Champions
1896/97	Cowes
1897/98	Eastleigh Athletic
1898/99	Southampton Reserves
1899/1900	Ryde Sports
1900/01	Royal Naval Barracks
1901/02	Southampton Reserves
1902/03	Portsmouth Reserves
1903/04	Portsmouth Reserves
1904/05	Royal Naval Barracks
1905/06	Portsmouth Reserves
1906/07	Salisbury City Reserves
1907/08	Portsmouth Reserves
1908/09	Title was shared
1909/10	Regional Sections
1910/11	Southampton Reserves
1911/12	Portsmouth Reserves
1912/13	Woolston
1913/14	Bournemouth
1914-15	
1919/20	Boscombe
1920/21	Bournemouth
1921/22	Portsmouth Reserves
1922/23	Bournemouth Gasworks Athletic
1923/24	Gosport Athletic
1924/25	Andover
1925/26	Ryde Sports
1926/27	Cowes
1927/28	Cowes
1928/29	Regional Sections
1929/30	Newport
1930/31	Cowes
1931/32	Bournemouth Gasworks Athletic
1932/33	Newport
1933/34	Andover
1934/35	Bournemouth Gasworks Athletic
1935/36	Bournemouth Gasworks Athletic
1936/37	Cowes
1937/38	Bournemouth Gasworks Athletic
1938/39	Newport
1939-45	
1945/46	Gosport Borough
1946/47	RAOC Hilsea
1947/48	Newport
1948/49	Andover
1949/50	Newport
1950/51	Andover
1951/52	Portsmouth 'A'
1952/53	[Newport
1953/54	Newport
1954/55	Salisbury City Reserves
1955/56	Cowes
1956/57	Newport
1957/58	Alton Town
1958/59	Bournemouth & Boscombe Athletic 'A'
1959/60	Fareham Town
1960/61	Salisbury City Reserves
1961/62	Andover
1962/63	Fareham Town
1963/64	Fareham Town
1964/65	Fareham Town
1965/66	Fareham Town
1966/67	Fareham Town
1967/68	Basingstoke Town
1968/69	Thornycroft Athletic
1969/70	Basingstoke Town
1970/71	Basingstoke Town
1971/72	Pirelli General
1972/73	Fareham Town
1973/74	Sholing Sports
1974/75	Fareham Town
1975/76	Brockenhurst
1976/77	Gosport Borough
1977/78	Gosport Borough
1978/79	Newport
1979/80	Newport
1980/81	Newport
1981/82	AFC Totton
1982/83	Sholing Sports
1983/84	Sholing Sports
1984/85	A.F.C. Totton
1985/86	East Cowes Victoria
1986/87	East Cowes Victoria
1987/88	B.A.T. Sports
1988/89	B.A.T. Sports
1989/90	Ryde Sports
1990/91	Locks Heath
1991/92	Colden Common
1992/93	Pirelli General
1993/94	Cowes Sports
1994/95	Ecchinswell
1995/96	Colden Common
1996/97	Moneyfields
1997/98	Blackfield & Langley
1998/99	Alton
1999/2000	Amesbury Town
2000/01	Vosper Thornycroft
2001/02	Alton
2002/03	Winchester City
2003/04	Vosper Thornycroft

== League Cup winners ==
Season	Winners
1991/92	Bishop's Waltham Town
1992/93	Cowes Sports
1993/94	Winchester City
1994/95	Ecchinswell
1995/96	Otterbourne
1996/97	AFC Newbury
1997/98	Poole Town
1998/99	Poole Town
1999/2000	Hayling United
2000/01	Cancelled due to bad weather
2001/02	Liss Athletic
2002/03	Winchester City
2003/04	East Cowes Victoria

== Clubs ==
- See Hampshire League clubs.

== Achievements by clubs in national cup competitions ==
During its 108-year existence, the Hampshire League was done proud when represented by its member clubs in the national cup competitions, especially in its heyday as listed below, when clubs frequently progressed past the early qualifying rounds:

FA Cup

- 1919/20 Thornycrofts (Woolston) reached 1st Round, v Burnley (home, drew 0-0, lost replay away 0–5)
- 1932/33 Ryde Sports reached 1st Round, v Margate (away, lost 0–5)
- 1936/37 Ryde Sports reached 1st Round, v Gillingham (home, lost 1–5)
- 1945/46 Newport reached 2nd Round, v Aldershot (lost 0–12 on aggregate)
- 1952/53 Newport reached 1st Round, v Swindon Town (away, lost 1–5)
- 1953/54 Newport reached 1st Round, v Swindon Town (away, lost 1–2)
- 1954/55 Newport reached 1st Round, v Hinckley Athletic (away, lost 3–4)
- 1956/57 Newport reached 1st Round, v Watford (home, lost 0–6)
- 1957/58 Newport reached 1st Round, v Hereford United (away, lost 0–3)
- 1958/59 Newport reached 1st Round, v Shrewsbury Town (away, lost 3–4)
- 1968/69 Waterlooville reached 1st Round, v Kettering Town (home, lost 1–2)
- 1972/73 Alton Town reached 1st Round, v Newport County (away, lost 1–5)

FA Trophy

- 1969/70 Thornycroft Athletic reached 1st Round, v Weymouth (away, lost 0–5)

FA Vase

- 1976/77 Gosport Borough reached Quarter Finals, v Barton Rovers (home, 1–1 away, lost replay 1–3)
- 1981/82 Sholing Sports reached 4th Round, v Shortwood United (away, lost 0–2)
- 1985/86 Havant Town reached Quarter Finals, v Wisbech Town (home, lost 1–5)
- 2002/03 Winchester City reached Quarter Finals, v Oadby Town (away, lost 0–1)

FA Amateur Cup

- 1910/11 RMLI Gosport won the competition, 2-1 v South Bank in Final
- 1929/30 Bournemouth Gasworks Athletic reached the Final, lost 1-5 v Ilford
- 1932/33 Bournemouth Gasworks Athletic reached the Semi-Finals, lost 1-2 v Stockton

== Historical position within English football league system ==
The following table shows the position of the various Hampshire leagues within the English football league system:

Season	Level 4	Level 5	Level 6	Level 7	Level 8	Level 9	Level 10	Level 11
1958–79	Football League Division 4	Southern League Premier	Southern League South	Hampshire League				
1979–86	Football League Division 4	Alliance Premier League	Southern League Premier	Southern League South	Hampshire League			
1986–2004	Football League Division 4	Football Conference	Southern League Premier Div	Southern League South Div	Wessex League	Hampshire League		
2004-	EFL - League Two	National League	National League South	Southern League Premier	Southern League South & West	Wessex League Premier Div	Wessex League Division 1	Hampshire Premier League

== Print ==
- A History of the Hampshire Football League 1896-1996 - by Norman Gannaway
- Hampshire League Tabulated History - by Stephen Farmery
