= 2024–25 Southern Football League =

The 2024–25 Southern Football League season was the 122nd in the history of the Southern League since its establishment in 1894. The league has two Premier divisions (Central and South) at Step 3 of the National League System (NLS) and two Division One divisions (Central and South) at Step 4. These correspond to levels 7 and 8 of the English football league system.

The allocations for Steps 3 and 4 this season were announced by The Football Association (FA) on 17 May 2024. There were to be 88 teams in the Southern League, 22 in each of the four divisions. However, Coalville Town, who were due to have competed in the Premier Division Central, subsequently resigned from the Southern League; their place was filled by Hitchin Town who were reprieved from relegation to Division One Central leaving an unfilled vacancy in that division, which therefore comprised 21 teams instead of 22.

Bedford Town were the champions.

== Premier Division Central ==
Southern Football League Premier Division Central
- Season: 2024–25
- Champions: Bedford Town
- Promoted: Bedford Town; AFC Telford United
- Relegated: Lowestoft Town; Hitchin Town; Biggleswade Town

Premier Division Central comprises 22 teams, 15 of which competed in the previous season.

=== Team changes ===
To the Premier Division Central

Promoted from Division One Central

- Bedford Town
- Biggleswade Town

Promoted from the Isthmian League North Division

- Lowestoft Town

Promoted from the Northern Premier League Division One Midlands

- Harborough Town
- Spalding United

Relegated from the National League North

- Banbury United
- Bishop's Stortford

From the Premier Division Central

Promoted to the National League North

- Leamington
- Needham Market

Transferred to the Northern Premier League Premier Division

- Mickleover

Relegated to Division One Central

- Berkhamsted

Relegated to the Northern Premier League Division One Midlands

- Long Eaton United

Resigned to the Midland Football League Division One

- Nuneaton Borough

Resigned to the United Counties League Division One

- Coalville Town

=== Premier Division Central table ===
Pos	Team	Pld	W	D	L	GF	GA	GD	Pts	Promotion, qualification or relegation
1	Bedford Town (C, P)	42	25	7	10	79	58	+21	82	Promotion to the National League North
2	Kettering Town	42	22	11	9	73	44	+29	77	Qualification for the play-offs (Note: Four teams played for one spot and promotion to the National League.)
3	AFC Telford United (O, P)	42	19	17	6	82	60	+22	74	Qualification for the play-offs
4	Halesowen Town	42	21	11	10	65	46	+19	74	Qualification for the play-offs
5	Harborough Town	42	20	11	11	65	42	+23	71	Qualification for the play-offs
6	Stamford	42	20	9	13	53	51	+2	69	
7	Spalding United	42	20	8	14	70	54	+16	68	
8	Stratford Town	42	18	13	11	61	44	+17	67	
9	Stourbridge	42	18	9	15	60	50	+10	63	
10	Leiston	42	16	12	14	56	58	−2	60	
11	Royston Town	42	14	15	13	51	49	+2	57	
12	Banbury United	42	14	15	13	40	40	0	57	
13	Alvechurch	42	16	8	18	49	46	+3	56	
14	Bromsgrove Sporting	42	15	6	21	57	61	−4	51	
15	Bishop's Stortford	42	14	9	19	52	62	−10	51	
16	St Ives Town	42	13	11	18	58	60	−2	50	
17	AFC Sudbury	42	13	11	18	52	57	−5	50	
18	Redditch United	42	13	10	19	50	58	−8	49	
19	Barwell	42	13	7	22	56	75	−19	46	Reprieved from relegation (Note: Barwell were reprieved from relegation due to the demotion of Farsley Celtic to the Northern Counties East League.)
20	Lowestoft Town (R)	42	10	7	25	55	106	−51	37	Relegation to the Isthmian League North
21	Hitchin Town (R)	42	8	10	24	54	84	−30	34	Relegation to Division One Central
22	Biggleswade Town (R)	42	5	13	24	44	77	−33	28	Relegation to Division One Central

Source: Southern League, Non League Matters
Rules for classification: 1) points; 2) goal difference; 3) number of goals scored; 4) number of matches won; 5) head-to-head results
(C) Champions; (O) Play-off winners; (P) Promoted; (R) Relegated

=== Play-offs ===
Semi-finals
2	Kettering Town	0 (4)
5	Harborough Town	0 (3)
3	AFC Telford United	3
4	Halesowen Town	2

Final
2	Kettering Town	2
3	AFC Telford United	4

==== Semifinals ====
30 April	AFC Telford United	3–2	Halesowen Town	Wellington
19:45	Hadley-Allen 42'; Pendley 45'; Stenson 78'		Donnelly 22'; Wragg 75'	Stadium: New Bucks Head; Attendance: 3,204

30 April	Kettering Town	0–0 (a.e.t.) (4–3 p)	Harborough Town	Burton Latimer
19:45				Stadium: Latimer Park; Attendance: 2,760
	Penalties
	Edwards (penalty missed); Thanoj (penalty missed); Hart (penalty scored); Kelly-Evans (penalty scored); Powell (penalty scored); McLintock (penalty missed); Johnson (penalty scored)		(penalty missed) Burgess; (penalty scored) Morgan; (penalty scored) Walsh; (penalty missed) Malone; (penalty scored) Williams; (penalty missed) Cordeiro; (penalty missed) Kennedy

==== Final ====
5 May	Kettering Town	2–4	AFC Telford United	Burton Latimer
15:00	Ranger 34'; York 47'		Pendley 48'; Fridye-Harper 60'; Piggott 67'; Hilton 90+2'	Stadium: Latimer Park; Attendance: 2,810

=== Results table ===
Home \ Away	SUD	TEL	ALV	BAN	BAR	BED	BIG	BIS	BRO	HAL	HAR	HIT	KET	LEI	LOW	RED	ROY	SPA	STI	STA	STO	STR
AFC Sudbury	—	2–2	1–0	1–2	1–1	1–2	2–2	1–2	1–0	0–0	1–5	1–1	0–1	1–2	6–1	1–0	1–1	0–0	0–0	3–0	3–0	3–0
AFC Telford United	2–0	—	1–1	1–1	3–0	6–2	1–1	4–1	2–1	2–0	0–0	5–4	1–3	3–1	7–1	2–1	1–1	1–1	3–1	2–0	1–5	2–1
Alvechurch	1–1	3–1	—	0–1	3–2	1–0	2–1	1–0	2–1	1–0	1–1	4–1	0–1	1–1	3–2	1–0	0–2	0–1	0–1	0–1	1–2	1–2
Banbury United	1–1	0–0	0–0	—	1–2	2–0	0–2	0–0	0–0	0–1	2–2	1–2	1–0	1–0	0–2	4–0	1–0	2–1	1–0	1–0	0–0	0–0
Barwell	3–1	2–0	5–3	0–1	—	0–1	3–1	4–1	2–3	0–5	2–2	4–0	2–1	0–0	1–2	0–1	0–3	1–7	3–2	0–1	0–2	2–1
Bedford Town	3–1	2–3	1–0	2–2	1–3	—	3–2	2–1	3–0	3–1	1–1	2–1	3–1	4–3	4–2	2–0	1–1	1–5	0–3	4–0	2–0	2–1
Biggleswade Town	1–1	1–1	1–1	0–2	2–2	1–1	—	2–3	0–1	0–1	2–3	1–1	0–1	0–0	1–0	1–1	0–4	3–4	1–0	0–2	1–4	0–2
Bishop's Stortford	0–1	2–2	2–1	1–1	1–0	1–2	1–2	—	0–2	1–2	0–4	3–2	0–2	1–2	4–0	2–0	1–2	2–0	1–0	2–2	3–1	1–1
Bromsgrove Sporting	3–0	1–1	0–2	1–2	3–0	0–3	3–0	2–3	—	1–2	1–1	1–1	1–2	0–1	3–1	1–2	2–1	2–0	2–3	0–1	2–0	1–3
Halesowen Town	3–1	1–1	2–2	1–0	0–0	1–4	3–1	4–0	0–2	—	1–0	0–4	2–1	1–1	3–1	2–1	2–1	2–1	1–0	2–0	3–1	2–3
Harborough Town	1–0	1–2	0–1	4–1	1–0	2–1	2–0	1–2	2–0	1–1	—	1–0	2–1	4–0	2–1	1–3	1–1	2–0	1–2	0–1	0–1	3–1
Hitchin Town	0–1	3–3	0–1	1–0	2–0	1–2	3–1	1–2	1–3	1–2	3–0	—	0–3	1–1	2–5	2–1	2–2	2–1	1–1	0–2	1–5	0–1
Kettering Town	2–1	1–1	2–1	2–2	3–0	2–2	3–1	2–1	1–2	0–0	1–1	2–2	—	2–1	4–1	3–1	1–0	4–0	2–3	2–0	2–0	1–1
Leiston	3–2	0–2	2–1	3–0	3–4	0–2	2–3	1–1	0–0	0–3	1–1	2–0	0–2	—	7–2	1–0	2–0	2–1	2–2	1–1	0–3	1–0
Lowestoft Town	1–3	1–2	0–4	2–5	1–0	2–3	2–2	2–1	3–0	0–5	1–0	2–1	0–0	0–0	—	0–1	3–2	0–5	1–1	0–3	1–2	1–2
Redditch United	1–2	3–1	0–1	0–0	3–2	1–1	1–1	1–0	1–0	2–2	0–1	4–0	3–2	1–2	3–4	—	0–0	1–1	1–1	2–1	1–3	1–1
Royston Town	3–0	3–3	0–2	1–0	3–2	1–0	3–2	0–0	2–1	1–0	0–2	2–2	1–0	1–1	1–1	3–1	—	0–3	0–0	1–1	2–2	0–1
Spalding United	0–3	0–1	0–0	2–0	2–1	1–0	3–2	1–3	1–1	2–0	0–2	3–2	1–1	1–2	3–2	2–1	0–0	—	3–1	5–0	2–1	3–0
St Ives Town	1–3	2–2	2–1	2–1	0–1	1–2	2–1	1–1	2–3	0–0	4–1	3–1	1–2	1–3	3–1	0–3	0–1	5–1	—	1–1	3–1	2–2
Stamford	1–0	1–3	1–0	2–0	3–1	2–3	2–1	1–0	3–2	2–2	1–2	2–0	1–1	0–2	2–2	2–0	3–1	1–1	2–1	—	1–0	0–2
Stourbridge	2–0	1–1	1–0	0–0	0–0	0–1	0–0	1–1	4–2	2–2	1–4	3–1	1–3	2–0	4–0	1–1	1–0	0–1	1–0	0–2	—	0–2
Stratford Town	3–0	4–0	3–1	1–1	1–1	1–1	1–0	1–0	2–3	2–0	0–0	1–1	3–3	3–0	1–1	1–2	3–0	0–1	2–0	1–1	0–2	—

Source: Southern League
Legend: Blue = home team win; Yellow = draw; Red = away team win.

=== Stadia and locations ===
Locations of the Premier Division Central clubs

Club	Location	Stadium	Capacity
AFC Sudbury	Sudbury	King's Marsh	2,500
AFC Telford United	Telford	New Bucks Head	6,300
Alvechurch	Alvechurch	Lye Meadow	3,000
Banbury United	Banbury	Spencer Stadium	2,000
Barwell	Barwell	Kirkby Road	2,500
Bedford Town	Bedford	The Eyrie	3,000
Biggleswade Town	Biggleswade	Langford Road	3,000
Bishop's Stortford	Bishop's Stortford	Woodside Park	4,525
Bromsgrove Sporting	Bromsgrove	Victoria Ground	4,893
Halesowen Town	Halesowen	The Grove	3,150
Harborough Town	Market Harborough	Bowden Park	1,000
Hitchin Town	Hitchin	Top Field	4,554
Kettering Town	Kettering	Latimer Park (groundshare with Burton Park Wanderers)	2,400
Leiston	Leiston	Victory Road	2,250
Lowestoft Town	Lowestoft	Crown Meadow	3,000
Redditch United	Redditch	The Valley	5,000
Royston Town	Royston	Garden Walk	5,000
Spalding United	Spalding	Sir Halley Stewart Field	3,500
St Ives Town	St Ives	Westwood Road	2,000
Stamford	Stamford	Borderville Sports Centre	2,000
Stourbridge	Stourbridge	War Memorial Athletic Ground	2,626
Stratford Town	Stratford-upon-Avon	Knights Lane	2,000

== Premier Division South ==
Southern Football League Premier Division South
- Season: 2024–25
- Champions: Merthyr Town
- Promoted: Merthyr Town
- Relegated: Winchester City; Swindon Supermarine; Frome Town; Marlow

Premier Division South comprises 22 teams, 15 of which competed in the previous season.

=== Team changes ===
To the Premier Division South

Promoted from Division One South

- Frome Town
- Wimborne Town

Promoted from the Isthmian League South Central Division

- Chertsey Town
- Marlow

Relegated from the National League North

- Gloucester City

Relegated from the National League South

- Havant & Waterlooville
- Taunton Town

From the Premier Division South

Promoted to the National League South

- Chesham United
- Salisbury

Transferred to the Isthmian League Premier Division

- Hendon

Relegated to Division One Central

- Beaconsfield Town

Relegated to Division One South

- Didcot Town

Relegated to the Isthmian League South Central Division

- Harrow Borough
- Hayes & Yeading United

=== Premier Division South table ===
Pos	Team	Pld	W	D	L	GF	GA	GD	Pts	Promotion, qualification or relegation
1	Merthyr Town (C, P)	42	27	10	5	105	46	+59	91	Promotion to the National League North
2	AFC Totton (O, P)	42	25	13	4	85	35	+50	88	Qualification for the play-offs (Note: Four teams play for one spot and promotion to the National League.)
3	Walton & Hersham	42	24	11	7	90	54	+36	83	Qualification for the play-offs
4	Gloucester City	42	21	14	7	81	53	+28	77	Qualification for the play-offs
5	Dorchester Town	42	19	18	5	75	48	+27	75	Qualification for the play-offs
6	Havant & Waterlooville	42	21	11	10	84	49	+35	74	
7	Hungerford Town	42	16	11	15	63	55	+8	59	
8	Hanwell Town	42	15	13	14	58	62	−4	58	
9	Taunton Town	42	13	18	11	64	58	+6	57	
10	Wimborne Town	42	15	12	15	49	56	−7	57	
11	Sholing	42	14	10	18	59	68	−9	52	
12	Gosport Borough	42	13	12	17	53	61	−8	51	
13	Plymouth Parkway	42	14	8	20	63	77	−14	50	
14	Poole Town	42	13	10	19	48	62	−14	49	
15	Basingstoke Town	42	11	15	16	62	64	−2	48	
16	Chertsey Town	42	14	5	23	67	82	−15	47	
17	Tiverton Town	42	12	11	19	39	71	−32	47	
18	Bracknell Town	42	11	13	18	57	72	−15	46	
19	Winchester City (R)	42	12	10	20	54	74	−20	46	Relegation to Division One South
20	Swindon Supermarine (R)	42	12	8	22	60	78	−18	44	Relegation to Division One South
21	Frome Town (R)	42	9	13	20	39	60	−21	40	Relegation to Division One South
22	Marlow (R)	42	5	6	31	45	115	−70	21	Relegation to Division One Central

Source: Southern League, Non League Matters
Rules for classification: 1) points; 2) goal difference; 3) number of goals scored; 4) number of matches won; 5) head-to-head results
(C) Champions; (O) Play-off winners; (P) Promoted; (R) Relegated

=== Play-offs ===
Semi-finals
2	AFC Totton (a.e.t.)	4
5	Dorchester Town	3
3	Walton & Hersham	2 (3)
4	Gloucester City	2 (5)

Final
2	AFC Totton	1
4	Gloucester City	0

==== Semifinals ====
30 April	AFC Totton	4–3 (a.e.t.)	Dorchester Town	Totton
19:45	Rendell 88'; Lee 90+7', 90+10'; Austin 118'	Report	Pardoe 5'; Roberts 18'; Dickonson 90+20'	Stadium: Testwood Stadium; Attendance: 2,019

30 April	Walton & Hersham	2–2 (a.e.t.) (3–5 p)	Gloucester City	Walton-on-Thames
19:45	Rogalski 5'; Taylor 12'		Hanks 20'; Williams 70'	Stadium: Elmbridge Sports Hub; Attendance: 1,766
	Penalties
	Bolton (penalty scored); Nuur (penalty scored); Obeng (penalty scored); Ridgley (penalty missed)		(penalty scored) Smalley; (penalty scored) Watts; (penalty scored) Cross; (penalty scored) Pinchard; (penalty scored) Williams

==== Final ====
5 May	AFC Totton	1–0	Gloucester City	Totton
15:00	Taylor 70'	Report		Stadium: Testwood Stadium; Attendance: 2,079

=== Results table ===
Home \ Away	TOT	BAS	BRA	CHE	DOR	FRO	GLO	GOS	HAN	HAV	HUN	MAR	MER	PLY	POO	SHO	SWI	TAU	TIV	W&H	WIM	WIN
AFC Totton	—	2–2	2–0	3–0	1–1	1–1	1–1	2–1	2–0	3–1	3–1	6–1	1–1	4–0	2–2	2–1	2–1	5–1	2–1	1–0	4–0	2–0
Basingstoke Town	0–0	—	1–1	1–3	2–0	0–1	1–1	0–1	3–4	0–3	1–1	2–2	4–0	0–1	1–3	1–1	3–0	0–2	1–3	1–0	2–1	2–0
Bracknell Town	1–1	1–1	—	1–1	1–1	4–1	0–1	4–0	4–1	1–1	0–4	4–1	1–2	1–3	0–0	1–4	4–2	0–2	2–0	1–5	0–0	1–3
Chertsey Town	1–2	3–0	3–1	—	0–1	1–1	1–0	0–2	0–2	0–4	4–1	2–5	1–2	1–2	2–1	4–0	3–4	3–3	2–2	1–2	1–2	3–3
Dorchester Town	3–2	3–2	1–0	3–1	—	4–0	1–0	0–2	0–3	1–1	4–2	6–0	2–2	1–0	3–2	1–1	4–1	1–1	5–0	1–0	1–1	1–0
Frome Town	0–4	1–1	1–2	0–1	2–3	—	0–0	0–0	1–0	1–1	0–1	3–3	0–2	5–0	2–3	0–3	3–0	0–2	1–2	2–2	0–1	0–1
Gloucester City	0–0	1–1	0–2	3–1	3–3	2–0	—	2–2	5–0	2–1	2–1	7–0	2–1	3–2	4–1	2–1	3–1	2–2	3–1	1–2	1–0	5–0
Gosport Borough	1–2	3–3	4–3	0–2	2–2	0–1	1–3	—	3–0	1–2	1–0	0–1	1–3	0–0	1–0	4–1	3–2	1–1	3–0	0–2	1–1	1–3
Hanwell Town	1–0	1–2	3–1	1–2	3–0	0–2	0–0	0–0	—	2–2	0–0	2–0	2–1	2–1	3–3	0–1	1–0	0–2	1–1	3–3	2–2	1–1
Havant & Waterlooville	1–1	5–1	3–0	3–0	1–1	5–0	4–0	3–1	5–2	—	0–0	5–1	0–1	1–1	2–1	4–1	3–2	2–0	3–1	2–3	2–0	0–1
Hungerford Town	0–3	2–1	1–2	3–0	1–2	0–0	1–0	5–2	2–0	1–0	—	4–0	1–3	9–3	1–1	2–1	0–2	1–0	1–1	1–1	1–1	0–1
Marlow	0–2	1–4	2–2	0–5	2–2	2–1	1–2	1–2	0–2	1–3	1–2	—	0–1	0–2	1–2	2–3	0–2	1–1	2–1	2–3	3–2	1–1
Merthyr Town	1–1	1–1	5–1	3–1	0–0	4–0	2–2	0–0	2–1	5–1	3–0	2–1	—	2–2	1–2	3–0	2–1	2–0	6–0	5–2	6–0	3–1
Plymouth Parkway	1–2	1–3	3–3	2–1	1–2	0–3	6–0	2–0	0–2	2–1	0–2	5–0	2–4	—	3–1	3–1	2–3	2–2	0–0	1–2	2–1	0–3
Poole Town	0–1	1–0	0–0	3–1	1–1	0–1	0–1	1–3	1–2	0–1	0–0	1–0	1–6	3–1	—	2–0	4–0	1–0	0–1	1–1	1–0	3–2
Sholing	0–3	2–2	2–1	3–0	1–5	1–1	0–0	1–1	0–1	5–1	4–0	1–0	0–3	2–1	0–0	—	3–5	2–0	1–0	1–2	0–1	0–1
Swindon Supermarine	1–1	2–2	1–2	1–0	1–0	1–0	1–3	0–0	2–2	1–1	1–3	3–1	1–5	2–2	5–0	1–2	—	1–2	4–0	0–3	0–0	2–0
Taunton Town	1–1	2–0	1–1	2–3	1–1	0–0	3–3	3–1	3–3	1–1	2–1	5–2	2–3	2–3	2–0	1–1	3–1	—	0–0	1–2	2–2	1–1
Tiverton Town	0–1	0–5	2–1	2–3	1–1	0–0	0–1	2–0	1–2	0–0	0–3	3–2	1–1	0–0	3–1	3–3	1–0	0–3	—	1–0	1–0	2–1
Walton & Hersham	3–2	1–1	2–0	3–2	2–2	1–1	4–4	2–2	2–2	2–0	1–1	3–0	5–2	2–0	2–0	2–1	4–2	0–1	3–0	—	2–1	4–2
Wimborne Town	3–1	1–0	1–2	1–3	1–1	1–0	1–1	1–0	1–0	1–2	2–1	3–1	1–1	1–0	1–0	1–1	0–0	3–0	3–0	0–4	—	2–4
Winchester City	1–4	2–4	0–0	4–1	0–0	1–3	2–4	0–2	1–1	1–3	2–2	3–1	1–3	0–1	1–1	0–2	1–0	1–1	0–2	2–1	2–4	—

Source: Southern League
Legend: Blue = home team win; Yellow = draw; Red = away team win.

=== Stadia and locations ===
Locations of the Premier Division South clubs
Greater London and environ Premier Division South clubs

Club	Location	Stadium	Capacity
AFC Totton	Totton	Testwood Stadium	3,000
Basingstoke Town	Basingstoke	Winklebury Football Complex (Basingstoke)	2,000
Bracknell Town	Sandhurst	SB Stadium	1,950
Chertsey Town	Chertsey	Alwyns Lane	2,500
Dorchester Town	Dorchester	The Avenue Stadium	5,000
Frome Town	Frome	Badgers Hill	2,000
Gloucester City	Gloucester	Meadow Park	3,600
Gosport Borough	Gosport	Privett Park	4,500
Hanwell Town	Perivale	Powerday Stadium	3,000
Havant & Waterlooville	Havant	Westleigh Park	5,300
Hungerford Town	Hungerford	Bulpit Lane	2,500
Marlow	Marlow	Alfred Davis Memorial Ground	3,000
Merthyr Town	Merthyr Tydfil	Penydarren Park	4,000
Plymouth Parkway	Plymouth	Bolitho Park	3,500
Poole Town	Poole	The BlackGold Stadium	2,500
Sholing	Sholing	Universal Stadium	1,000
Swindon Supermarine	South Marston	Hunts Copse Ground	3,000
Taunton Town	Taunton	Wordsworth Drive	2,500
Tiverton Town	Tiverton	Ladysmead	3,500
Walton & Hersham	Walton-on-Thames	Elmbridge Sports Hub	2,500
Wimborne Town	Wimborne Minster	The Cuthbury	3,000
Winchester City	Winchester	The City Ground	4,500

== Division One Central ==
Southern Football League Division One Central
- Season: 2024–25
- Champions: Real Bedford
- Promoted: Real Bedford; Berkhamsted
- Relegated: Kings Langley; Kidlington; North Leigh

Division One Central comprises 21 teams, 14 of which competed in the previous season. It had been intended that there would be 22 teams, but Hitchin Town were reprieved from relegation from the Premier Division Central following the resignation of Coalville Town.

=== Team changes ===
To Division One Central

Promoted from the Spartan South Midlands Football League Premier Division

- Leverstock Green
- Real Bedford

Promoted from the Combined Counties Football League Premier Division North

- Flackwell Heath

Relegated from the Premier Division Central

- Berkhamsted

Relegated from the Premier Division South

- Beaconsfield Town

Transferred from the Isthmian League North Division

- Enfield

Transferred from the Isthmian League South Central Division

- Northwood

From Division One Central

Promoted to the Premier Division Central

- Bedford Town
- Biggleswade Town

Transferred to the Isthmian League North Division

- Waltham Abbey

Relegated to the Spartan South Midlands Football League Premier Division

- Kempston Rovers

Resigned to the Hellenic Football League Premier Division

- Cirencester Town

=== Division One Central table ===
Pos	Team	Pld	W	D	L	GF	GA	GD	Pts	Promotion, qualification or relegation
1	Real Bedford (C, P)	40	33	5	2	129	33	+96	104	Promotion to Premier Division Central
2	Berkhamsted (O, P)	40	27	8	5	94	47	+47	89	Qualification for the play-offs (Note: Four teams play for one spot and possible promotion to Step 3.)
3	Flackwell Heath	40	26	6	8	89	45	+44	84	Qualification for the play-offs
4	Barton Rovers	40	22	11	7	72	47	+25	77	Qualification for the play-offs
5	Hadley	40	22	9	9	81	49	+32	75	Qualification for the play-offs
6	Thame United	40	22	6	12	77	58	+19	72	
7	Leighton Town	40	18	9	13	63	52	+11	63	
8	Biggleswade	40	16	10	14	62	72	−10	58	
9	Welwyn Garden City	40	16	9	15	58	53	+5	57	
10	Ware	40	13	17	10	64	51	+13	56	
11	Beaconsfield Town	40	13	11	16	58	62	−4	50	
12	Enfield	40	12	12	16	62	68	−6	48	
13	Hertford Town	40	12	12	16	59	67	−8	48	
14	AFC Dunstable	40	13	8	19	50	68	−18	47	
15	Aylesbury United	40	14	3	23	46	70	−24	45	
16	Northwood	40	12	4	24	58	79	−21	40	
17	Stotfold	40	11	7	22	52	86	−34	40	
18	Leverstock Green	40	9	12	19	46	63	−17	39	
19	Kings Langley (R)	40	9	11	20	52	64	−12	38	Relegation to the Spartan South Midlands League
20	Kidlington (R)	40	7	7	26	39	90	−51	28	Relegation to the Combined Counties League
21	North Leigh (R)	40	2	5	33	23	110	−87	11	Relegation to the Combined Counties League

Source: Southern League, Non League Matters
Rules for classification: 1) points; 2) goal difference; 3) number of goals scored; 4) number of matches won; 5) head-to-head results
(C) Champions; (O) Play-off winners; (P) Promoted; (R) Relegated

=== Play-offs ===
Semi-finals
2	Berkhamsted	5
5	Hadley	0
3	Flackwell Heath	2
4	Barton Rovers	0

Final
2	Berkhamsted	5
3	Flackwell Heath	0

==== Semifinals ====
30 April	Berkhamsted	5–0	Hadley	Berkhamsted
19:45	Tomlinson 35'; Andrews 39'; Kinnane 43'; Christie 47'; Collier 79'			Stadium: Broadwater; Attendance: 896

30 April	Flackwell Heath	2–0	Barton Rovers	Flackwell Heath
19:45	Makowski 5', 90'	Report		Stadium: Wilks Park; Attendance: 718; Referee: Callum Parke

==== Final ====
5 May	Berkhamsted	5–0	Flackwell Heath	Berkhamsted
3:00	Lacey 38', 89'; Bateman 58', 82'; Tomlinson 63'	Report		Stadium: Broadwater; Attendance: 1,963

=== Results table ===
Home \ Away	DUN	AYU	BAR	BEA	BER	BIG	ENF	FLA	HAD	HER	KID	KLL	LEI	LEV	NLE	NWD	RBE	STO	THM	WAR	WGC
AFC Dunstable	—	0–1	2–4	1–1	1–3	1–2	4–2	0–1	1–1	3–2	2–0	0–0	1–0	1–3	3–2	2–1	0–1	1–0	0–0	0–0	3–1
Aylesbury United	1–3	—	1–3	0–2	1–4	1–3	2–2	1–0	0–2	2–0	0–1	2–0	0–1	1–0	1–1	1–0	1–4	0–1	0–3	3–0	1–1
Barton Rovers	2–1	1–2	—	0–0	2–1	3–0	1–1	2–1	1–1	1–0	0–0	2–1	3–2	2–1	4–0	2–2	0–4	4–2	3–0	2–0	2–0
Beaconsfield Town	2–2	3–0	0–3	—	1–2	1–3	1–1	1–2	2–2	3–1	4–2	2–1	1–3	2–2	3–0	1–2	1–2	2–2	0–1	0–3	3–1
Berkhamsted	1–0	2–0	1–1	1–3	—	2–0	2–1	2–0	4–1	3–5	0–0	3–1	2–2	1–0	4–0	5–1	0–0	4–0	2–0	2–0	4–3
Biggleswade	3–0	0–3	0–4	1–0	1–2	—	2–2	2–3	2–1	1–0	1–0	1–3	2–0	3–3	1–1	5–2	0–4	3–1	2–3	1–1	2–1
Enfield	1–5	3–2	3–1	0–2	2–2	2–2	—	0–2	1–0	2–1	7–0	2–0	1–5	1–4	2–1	2–0	1–3	4–2	0–1	1–1	2–3
Flackwell Heath	6–0	5–0	0–3	2–1	2–4	3–0	2–1	—	4–1	3–1	2–0	1–0	3–0	3–1	3–0	1–1	0–1	2–0	2–0	2–2	0–0
Hadley	3–0	1–0	5–0	3–1	4–1	1–0	1–0	0–3	—	1–1	3–0	2–1	1–4	2–2	6–0	4–0	0–2	2–0	3–0	2–1	1–0
Hertford Town	4–1	3–2	2–2	1–1	1–1	2–0	1–1	4–6	2–2	—	2–1	0–0	4–1	0–1	2–1	4–2	0–3	1–1	1–2	1–5	2–2
Kidlington	1–2	2–3	1–1	0–0	1–4	1–3	3–1	0–3	1–2	1–1	—	0–1	1–0	1–3	1–2	2–5	0–3	3–2	0–2	1–1	2–4
Kings Langley	1–1	1–2	0–1	0–2	2–2	2–2	1–1	3–3	2–4	1–4	2–3	—	0–1	4–0	3–0	3–1	3–2	1–1	0–2	2–3	2–2
Leighton Town	1–0	2–0	2–0	3–0	1–2	1–1	2–4	3–2	2–1	2–0	2–1	2–2	—	0–0	2–0	2–0	1–4	3–4	1–2	1–1	2–0
Leverstock Green	4–0	0–3	0–1	1–1	0–3	1–1	1–1	1–1	0–1	0–0	1–2	3–0	2–2	—	2–0	1–0	0–3	2–0	0–1	0–1	1–3
North Leigh	0–2	0–3	0–2	0–2	2–5	0–2	0–0	2–3	2–6	0–2	1–3	0–2	0–3	3–2	—	1–4	0–3	2–3	0–1	0–0	1–1
Northwood	1–0	0–2	1–1	0–2	1–3	6–0	1–2	0–2	0–2	1–2	3–0	2–3	3–0	2–2	2–0	—	1–3	1–0	3–2	1–3	1–2
Real Bedford	3–1	3–2	5–1	7–1	5–1	6–2	3–1	5–5	1–1	2–0	5–1	1–0	0–0	3–1	8–0	5–0	—	6–0	7–2	1–1	1–2
Stotfold	2–1	1–0	1–1	2–3	0–2	3–4	0–3	0–1	1–1	1–0	3–2	0–3	2–3	1–0	3–0	2–4	0–2	—	2–2	1–4	2–1
Thame United	2–3	4–0	0–0	3–2	0–4	1–3	2–0	1–2	4–4	4–0	5–0	3–1	1–0	4–0	3–1	2–1	1–2	4–4	—	4–0	0–1
Ware	2–2	6–2	3–2	1–1	1–1	1–1	2–1	2–1	1–2	1–1	1–1	0–0	1–1	1–1	4–0	0–1	1–3	4–0	2–3	—	1–2
Welwyn Garden City	3–0	2–0	1–4	1–0	1–2	0–0	0–0	0–2	2–1	0–1	3–0	1–0	0–0	4–0	4–0	3–1	1–3	0–2	2–2	0–2	—

Source: Southern League
Legend: Blue = home team win; Yellow = draw; Red = away team win.

=== Stadia and locations ===
Locations of Division One Central clubs
Locations of Division One Central clubs (Hertfordshire and surroundings)

Club	Location	Stadium	Capacity
AFC Dunstable	Dunstable	Creasey Park	3,200
Aylesbury United	Chesham	The Meadow (groundshare with Chesham United)	5,000
Barton Rovers	Barton-le-Clay	Sharpenhoe Road	4,000
Beaconsfield Town	Beaconsfield	Holloways Park	3,500
Berkhamsted	Berkhamsted	Broadwater	2,500
Biggleswade	Biggleswade	The Eyrie (groundshare with Bedford Town)	3,000
Enfield	Bishop's Stortford	Woodside Park (groundshare with Bishop's Stortford)	4,525
Flackwell Heath	Flackwell Heath	Wilks Park	2,000
Hadley	London (Arkley)	Brickfield Lane	2,000
Hertford Town	Hertford	Hertingfordbury Park	6,500
Kidlington	Kidlington	Yarnton Road	1,500
Kings Langley	Kings Langley	Sadiku Stadium	1,963
Leighton Town	Leighton Buzzard	Bell Close	2,800
Leverstock Green	Leverstock Green	Pancake Lane	1,500
North Leigh	North Leigh	Eynsham Hall Park Sports Ground	2,000
Northwood	Northwood	Northwood Park	3,075
Real Bedford	Bedford	McMullen Park	1,500
Stotfold	Stotfold	The JSJ Stadium	1,500
Thame United	Thame	Meadow View Park	2,000
Ware	Ware	Wodson Park	3,300
Welwyn Garden City	Welwyn Garden City	Herns Way	1,000

== Division One South ==
Southern Football League Division One South
- Season: 2024–25
- Champions: Yate Town
- Promoted: Yate Town; Evesham United
- Relegated: Helston Athletic; Thatcham Town; Cribbs; Cinderford Town

Division One South comprises 22 teams, 16 of which competed in the previous season.

=== Team changes ===
To Division One South

Promoted from the Hellenic Football League Premier Division

- Cinderford Town

Promoted from the Wessex Football League Premier Division

- Shaftesbury

Promoted from the Western Football League Premier Division

- Falmouth Town
- Helston Athletic

Relegated from the Premier Division South

- Didcot Town

Transferred from the Isthmian League South Central Division

- Thatcham Town

From Division One South

Promoted to the Premier Division South

- Frome Town
- Wimborne Town

Relegated to the Western Football League Premier Division

- Paulton Rovers

Resigned to the Wessex League Division One

- Hamworthy United

=== Division One South table ===
Pos	Team	Pld	W	D	L	GF	GA	GD	Pts	Promotion, qualification or relegation
1	Yate Town (C, P)	42	26	10	6	72	38	+34	88	Promotion to Premier Division South
2	Evesham United (O, P)	42	25	7	10	66	36	+30	82	Qualification for the play-offs (Note: Four teams play for one spot and promotion to Step 3.)
3	Bishop's Cleeve	42	24	6	12	76	34	+42	78	Qualification for the play-offs
4	Malvern Town	42	21	12	9	96	62	+34	75	Qualification for the play-offs
5	Exmouth Town	42	22	8	12	69	39	+30	74	Qualification for the play-offs
6	Mousehole	42	20	12	10	82	54	+28	72	
7	Bemerton Heath Harlequins (R)	42	21	9	12	79	58	+21	72	Resigned and demoted to the Wessex League
8	Melksham Town	42	17	12	13	72	54	+18	63	
9	Falmouth Town	42	17	7	18	62	61	+1	58	
10	Bideford	42	15	13	14	64	65	−1	58	
11	Didcot Town	42	15	12	15	55	63	−8	57	
12	Bristol Manor Farm	42	13	16	13	73	70	+3	55	
13	Westbury United	42	15	10	17	58	57	+1	55	
14	Bashley	42	14	13	15	54	66	−12	55	
15	Willand Rovers	42	13	13	16	61	62	−1	52	
16	Tavistock	42	14	8	20	55	58	−3	49 (Note: Tavistock were deducted one point.)	
17	Shaftesbury	42	13	7	22	64	86	−22	46	
18	Larkhall Athletic	42	11	10	21	56	79	−23	43	
19	Helston Athletic (R)	42	10	11	21	54	100	−46	41	Relegation to the Western League
20	Thatcham Town (R)	42	10	9	23	46	78	−32	39	Relegation to the Combined Counties League
21	Cribbs (R)	42	9	6	27	35	86	−51	33	Relegation to the Hellenic League
22	Cinderford Town (R)	42	8	7	27	56	99	−43	31	Relegation to the Hellenic League

Source: Southern League website, Non League Matters
Rules for classification: 1) points; 2) goal difference; 3) number of goals scored; 4) number of matches won; 5) head-to-head results
(C) Champions; (O) Play-off winners; (P) Promoted; (R) Relegated

=== Play-offs ===
Semi-finals
2	Evesham United	4
5	Exmouth Town	1
3	Bishop's Cleeve	2
4	Malvern Town (a.e.t.)	3

Final
2	Evesham United	1
4	Malvern Town	0

==== Semifinals ====
30 April	Bishop's Cleeve	2–3 (a.e.t.)	Malvern Town	Bishop's Cleeve
19:45	Ross Langsworthy 25'; Malshanskyj 36'		Clark 16'; Watts 72' (pen.); Johnson 99'	Stadium: Kayte Lane

30 April	Evesham United	4–1	Exmouth Town	Evesham
19:45	Steele 57'; Middleton 58', 90+1'; Wright 77'		Griffith 45+2'	Stadium: The Spiers & Hartwell Stadium; Attendance: 561

==== Final ====
5 May	Evesham United	1–0	Malvern Town	Evesham
3:00	Steele 63'			Stadium: The Spiers & Hartwell Stadium; Attendance: 2,949

=== Results table ===
Home \ Away	BAS	BHH	BID	BIS	BMF	CIN	CRI	DID	EVE	EXM	FAL	HEL	LAR	MAL	MEL	MOU	SHA	TAV	THA	WES	WIL	YAT
Bashley	—	1–0	3–2	0–1	1–1	1–3	1–0	2–1	2–3	0–4	2–1	2–2	0–1	1–1	2–2	1–1	2–2	3–2	1–1	2–0	3–2	1–2
Bemerton Heath Harlequins	2–1	—	1–1	1–0	7–0	4–1	2–0	1–1	1–1	1–0	0–1	3–2	5–2	4–3	2–2	1–1	4–1	5–1	2–1	0–1	2–1	2–1
Bideford	1–2	3–1	—	1–0	0–0	0–0	1–2	2–1	2–1	0–2	1–2	1–0	2–1	3–3	1–2	4–1	3–2	0–2	1–1	2–0	1–0	1–1
Bishop's Cleeve	3–0	1–0	0–1	—	3–3	4–2	1–1	2–0	1–0	0–1	1–0	9–0	3–1	4–1	0–0	2–1	3–1	3–0	4–4	2–0	0–0	1–2
Bristol Manor Farm	2–0	1–1	4–1	0–2	—	0–0	4–0	1–1	1–3	1–0	5–1	5–5	3–2	2–2	0–0	0–2	0–2	0–3	2–2	0–0	2–0	0–3
Cinderford Town	1–2	1–3	2–3	3–0	1–6	—	1–2	1–3	0–2	2–2	2–3	0–1	0–3	0–4	3–2	2–2	3–1	2–3	2–2	1–2	0–2	0–2
Cribbs	1–0	0–1	0–3	0–2	0–2	1–3	—	0–3	1–4	0–3	2–2	1–2	1–2	0–1	1–2	0–2	1–0	1–1	3–0	0–0	3–3	1–4
Didcot Town	0–0	2–1	3–0	0–1	2–1	1–1	1–0	—	1–1	0–2	3–2	0–0	1–0	3–1	2–1	2–2	3–5	2–1	1–0	1–0	0–0	0–1
Evesham United	1–2	2–2	3–1	0–4	2–0	1–0	2–0	3–0	—	0–0	4–0	3–2	5–0	0–2	2–0	1–0	5–0	1–0	2–1	2–1	0–4	2–1
Exmouth Town	3–0	1–2	1–2	0–2	3–2	2–1	2–0	4–1	0–0	—	3–0	2–0	1–3	2–2	2–2	1–1	2–0	1–0	3–0	0–1	1–2	2–0
Falmouth Town	0–3	1–2	2–2	0–1	1–1	0–1	4–0	4–1	1–2	2–1	—	1–0	1–0	2–2	0–1	2–0	2–1	1–0	1–0	0–0	3–3	2–3
Helston Athletic	1–1	0–1	2–1	2–1	2–2	2–8	2–1	0–3	1–1	1–2	2–1	—	1–1	3–4	1–3	4–2	1–1	2–1	2–2	3–3	2–2	0–2
Larkhall Athletic	1–1	1–4	2–1	1–5	1–1	5–0	3–3	3–2	1–1	0–4	2–3	3–0	—	2–2	2–1	1–1	0–1	2–2	3–0	3–2	1–1	0–2
Malvern Town	5–2	3–2	2–2	0–3	5–4	2–2	5–1	5–1	1–0	2–1	2–1	4–0	4–0	—	0–2	2–3	2–0	2–2	3–0	3–0	4–1	1–1
Melksham Town	4–0	4–1	1–1	1–0	2–3	6–1	0–1	1–2	0–1	3–3	1–0	1–0	2–1	0–3	—	2–2	2–0	0–3	4–0	2–0	3–0	1–1
Mousehole	1–1	3–2	4–1	2–1	3–0	3–1	4–0	5–0	1–0	0–1	1–1	4–0	1–0	2–1	2–4	—	5–1	1–2	2–0	0–2	4–0	2–1
Shaftesbury	2–2	4–1	3–3	0–3	0–3	4–1	0–2	2–1	0–2	2–1	0–2	7–0	2–2	1–1	4–3	2–5	—	0–0	2–1	5–2	1–0	0–4
Tavistock	1–0	1–0	0–0	0–1	1–2	4–0	3–1	3–3	0–1	0–1	2–3	1–4	3–0	0–2	3–2	0–0	3–1	—	2–0	1–2	0–1	0–1
Thatcham Town	0–2	1–2	3–2	0–0	2–1	1–0	0–2	0–0	1–0	2–3	0–6	3–0	1–0	3–0	1–1	2–3	1–0	2–0	—	1–5	4–1	1–3
Westbury United	2–2	3–0	2–2	1–0	1–5	1–2	5–0	2–2	0–1	0–1	2–1	1–2	3–0	1–0	1–1	2–2	0–2	2–2	2–1	—	1–0	1–2
Willand Rovers	0–1	2–2	2–4	2–1	2–2	3–0	4–0	1–1	0–1	1–1	0–1	4–0	2–0	1–1	1–0	3–0	2–1	1–2	3–1	0–4	—	1–1
Yate Town	3–1	1–1	1–1	2–1	1–1	4–2	1–2	1–0	1–0	1–0	2–1	2–0	1–0	0–3	1–1	1–1	3–1	2–0	2–0	1–0	3–3	—

Source: Southern League
Legend: Blue = home team win; Yellow = draw; Red = away team win.

=== Stadia and locations ===
Locations of Division One South clubs

Club	Location	Stadium	Capacity
Bashley	Bashley	Bashley Road	4,250
Bemerton Heath Harlequins	Bemerton	Moon Park	2,100
Bideford	Bideford	The Sports Ground	2,000
Bishop's Cleeve	Bishop's Cleeve	Kayte Lane	1,500
Bristol Manor Farm	Bristol (Sea Mills)	The Creek	2,000
Cinderford Town	Cinderford	Causeway Ground	3,500
Cribbs	Cribbs Causeway	The Lawns	1,000
Didcot Town	Didcot	Loop Meadow	3,000
Evesham United	Evesham	Jubilee Stadium	3,000
Exmouth Town	Exmouth	Southern Road	1,500
Falmouth Town	Falmouth	Bickland Park	3,572
Helston Athletic	Helston	Kellaway Park	1,300
Larkhall Athletic	Bath (Larkhall)	The Plain Ham Ground	1,000
Malvern Town	Malvern	Langland Stadium	2,500
Melksham Town	Melksham	Oakfield Stadium	2,500
Mousehole	Mousehole	Trungle Parc	1,000
Shaftesbury	Shaftesbury	Cockrams	1,000
Tavistock	Tavistock	Langsford Park	2,000
Thatcham Town	Thatcham	Waterside Park	1,500
Westbury United	Westbury	Meadow Lane	1,000
Willand Rovers	Willand	The Stan Robinson Stadium	1,000
Yate Town	Yate	Lodge Road	2,000
