= Matty Stenson =

English footballer (born 1994)

Personal information
- Full name: Matthew Stenson
- Date of birth: 16 March 1994 (age 32)
- Place of birth: Coventry, England
- Height: 6 ft 2 in (1.88 m)
- Position: Forward

Team information
- Current team: AFC Telford United

Youth career
- 200?–20??: Coventry City
- 201?–2012: Hinckley United

Senior career*
Years	Team	Apps	(Gls)
2012–2013	Hinckley United	9	(0)
2014–2017	Leicester Road	54	(46)
2017–2018	Barwell	?	(?)
2018	Leamington	12	(6)
2018–2020	Solihull Moors	24	(2)
2019–2020	→ AFC Telford United (loan)	20	(4)
2020–2022	FC Halifax Town	8	(0)
2021	→ Tamworth (loan)	3	(2)
2022	→ Kidderminster Harriers (loan)	5	(0)
2023–2024	Nuneaton Borough	51	(21)
2024–	AFC Telford United	52	(38)
- * Club domestic league appearances and goals as of 17:27, 16 August 2025 (UTC)

Matthew Stenson (born 16 March 1994) is an English semi-professional footballer who plays as a forward for National League North club AFC Telford United.

A former Coventry City youth player, Stenson rebuilt his career after a long injury lay-off with prolific spells at Leicester Road and Barwell before moving up the Non-League ladder with Leamington, Solihull Moors and FC Halifax Town. After further loans following more lengthy injuries and an 18-month stint at Nuneaton Borough, he returned to AFC Telford United in 2024.

== Career ==
=== Early career ===
Stenson joined Coventry City aged 8, spending eight years at the club before leaving aged 15. He subsequently joined the youth academy at Hinckley United, where he would break into the first team, before a hip injury that required surgery would keep him out of the game for two-and-a-half years.

On his return from injury he joined Midland League Division Two club Leicester Road, one of two phoenix clubs of the defunct Hinckley United, where he would score 37 goals in 37 appearances in his first full season since his return. He spent a further season at the club, where in one fixture he would score four times in 30 minutes in a record 11–0 home win, before stepping up to Step 3 and joining Northern Premier League Premier Division club Barwell in 2017. In his solitary season at Barwell, he earned the club's top goalscorer award with 20 goals as well as goal of the season.

In August 2018, Stenson signed for National League North club Leamington. After two games for the club, he signed a one-year contract.

=== Full-time career ===
On 25 October 2018, Stenson made his first move up to Step 1 and full-time, professional football, signing for National League club Solihull Moors for an undisclosed fee, reported to be £25,000, on an 18-month contract. In October 2019, Stenson joined National League North club AFC Telford United on a three-month loan. His loan was extended in January, until the end of the season. He was released by Solihull in May 2020.

On 8 August 2020, Stenson signed for FC Halifax Town on a two-year contract. After missing the first three months of the season through injury, he suffered a severe knee injury, including a torn ACL, 16 minutes into his debut. In November 2021, to aid his recovery from injury and give him game time, Stenson joined Southern League Premier Division Central club Tamworth on a one-month loan and scored on his debut. In March 2022, he joined National League North club Kidderminster Harriers on loan until the end of the season, however was recalled from his loan on 21 April after five appearances. He scored his first and only goal in his final appearance for Halifax in the play-off quarter-final defeat to Chesterfield in May 2022. He was released by the club June 2022, following the expiry of this contract.

=== Return to semi-professional football ===
On 10 June 2022, after his release by Halifax, Stenson signed for Southern League Premier Division Central club Nuneaton Borough and returning to part-time, semi-professional football. He extended his stay with the club in June 2023, before leaving in January 2024 with the threat of the club's liquidation looming.

In January 2024, Stenson completed a return to Southern League Premier Division Central club AFC Telford United on a deal until the end of the season. In May 2024, he renewed his stay with the club for the 2024–25 season, a season in which he would end up the league's top goalscorer, be awarded the club's player of the year, break the club record of most goals in a single season across all competitions, as well as most goals scored in a single fixture.

In June 2025, he renewed his stay with the club once more for the 2025–26 season, in which Telford would be returning to the National League North after winning the play-offs the previous season and earning promotion.

== Style of play ==
Originally a midfielder, Stenson was asked to convert to a striker by his then-Leicester Road and former Hinckley United manager Neil Lyne. Former Coventry City player and manager Bobby Gould later described Stenson as "a big centre-forward; he can run, he’s got pace, he competes and he’s a battler".

== Career statistics ==
As of match played 16 August 2025

Appearances and goals by club, season and competition
Club	Season	League			FA Cup		Other		Total	
Club	Season	Division	Apps	Goals	Apps	Goals	Apps	Goals	Apps	Goals
Hinckley United	2012–13	Conference North	9	0	0	0	0	0	9	0
Hinckley United	2013–14	SL Premier Division	— (Note: Hinckley United's league record was officially expunged on 21 October 2014)		? (Note: Data for FA Cup second qualifying round not available)	0	—		?	0
Hinckley United	Total		9	0	?	0	—		?	0
Barwell	2017–18	NPL Premier Division	No data available							
Leamington	2018–19	National League North	12	6	1	1	—		13	7
Solihull Moors	2018–19	National League	17	1	0	0	4 (Note: Appearance(s) in FA Trophy)	0	21	1
Solihull Moors	2019–20	National League	7	1	0	0	1 (Note: Appearance in Scottish Challenge Cup)	1	8	2
Solihull Moors	Total		24	2	0	0	5	1	29	3
AFC Telford United (loan)	2019–20	National League North	20	4	—		1	0	21	4
FC Halifax Town	2020–21	National League	1	0	0	0	0	0	1	0
FC Halifax Town	2021–22	National League	7	0	0	0	1 (Note: Appearance in National League play-offs)	1	8	1
FC Halifax Town	Total		8	0	0	0	1	1	9	1
Tamworth (loan)	2021–22	SL Premier Division Central	3	2	—		—		3	2
Kidderminster Harriers (loan)	2021–22	National League North	5	0	—		—		5	0
Nuneaton Borough	2022–23	SL Premier Division Central	32	9	3	2	2 (Note: Appearances in Southern League Premier Division Central play-offs)	0	37	11
Nuneaton Borough	2023–24	SL Premier Division Central	19	12	1	0	3 (Note: Two appearances, one goal in FA Trophy; one appearance, one goal in Birmingham Senior Cup)	2	23	14
Nuneaton Borough	Total		51	21	4	2	5	2	60	25
AFC Telford United	2023–24	SL Premier Division Central	14	6	0	0	2	0	16	6
AFC Telford United	2024–25	SL Premier Division Central	36	31	0	0	5 (Note: Three appearances in FA Trophy; two appearances, one goal in Southern League Premier Division Central play-offs)	1	41	32
AFC Telford United	2025–26	National League North	2	1	0	0	0	0	2	1
AFC Telford United	Total		52	38	0	0	7	1	59	39
Career total			184	73	?	3	19	5	?	81

== Honours ==
AFC Telford United

- Southern League Premier Division Central play-offs: 2024–25

Leicester Road

- Leicestershire and Rutland Senior Cup: 2016–17

Solihull Moors

- National League runner-up: 2018–19

Individual

- Midland League Division One Joint Player of the Season: 2016–17
- AFC Telford United Players' Player of the Season: 2024–25
- AFC Telford United Supporters' Player of the Season: 2024–25
