= Anis Nuur =

English footballer (born 1997)

Personal information
- Date of birth: 24 January 1997 (age 29)
- Place of birth: Bermondsey, England
- Height: 1.80 m (5 ft 11 in)
- Position: Midfielder

Team information
- Current team: Farnborough
- Number: 21

Youth career
- Colliers Wood United

Senior career*
Years	Team	Apps	(Gls)
2016–2017	Colliers Wood United	31	(3)
2017–2018	Balham	39	(6)
2018	Tooting & Mitcham United	1	(0)
2018–2019	Hanwell Town	4	(0)
2019–2020	Westfield	27	(1)
2020	Hartley Wintney	6	(0)
2020	Guildford City	1	(0)
2021	Cray Wanderers	4	(0)
2021–2022	Hendon	14	(0)
2022	Metropolitan Police	2	(0)
2022	Westfield	5	(0)
2022–2023	Hartley Wintney	32	(1)
2023–2026	Walton & Hersham	100	(10)
2026–	Farnborough	1	(0)

International career^{‡}
2022	Somalia	1	(0)
- * Club domestic league appearances and goals as of 22:22, 3 November 2026 (UTC) ‡ National team caps and goals as of 16:45, 3 April 2022 (UTC)

Anis Nuur (born 24 January 1997) is a footballer who plays as a midfielder for National League South club Farnborough. Born in England, he has represented the Somalia national team at international level.

== Club career ==
Nuur began his career in the youth set-up at Colliers Wood United. During the 2017–18 season, Nuur played for Balham. In the following season, Nuur spent time with Tooting & Mitcham United and Hanwell Town, before joining Westfield. In 2020, Nuur signed for Hartley Wintney, making eleven appearances in all competitions for the club. In October 2021, after starting the season at Cray Wanderers, Nuur signed for Hendon. In February 2022, Nuur signed for Metropolitan Police.

Ahead of the 2022–23 season, Nuur re-joined his former club, Hartley Wintney. A year later, ahead of the 2023–24 season, Nuur signed with Walton & Hersham. On 30 October 2026, it was confirmed that Nuur had left Walton & Hersham following a three-year spell for the club. He departed having made 116 appearances and scoring 14 goals.

On 3 November 2026, Nuur joined fellow National League South club Farnborough following his departure from Walton & Hersham.

== International career ==
On 27 March 2022, Nuur made his debut for Somalia in a 2–1 loss against Eswatini in the qualification for the 2023 Africa Cup of Nations.

== Career statistics ==
As of match played 3 November 2026

Appearances and goals by club, season and competition
Club	Season	League			FA Cup		EFL Cup		Other		Total	
Club	Season	Division	Apps	Goals	Apps	Goals	Apps	Goals	Apps	Goals	Apps	Goals
Colliers Wood United	2016–17	Combined Counties League Premier Division	31	3	0	0	—		1 (Note: Appearance in the Combined Counties League Premier Challenge Cup)	0	32	3
Balham	2017–18	Combined Counties League Premier Division	39	6	0	0	—		0	0	39	6
Tooting & Mitcham United	2018–19	Isthmian League South Central Division	1	0	1	0	—		0	0	2	0
Hanwell Town	2018–19	Isthmian League South Central Division	4	0	—		—		—		4	0
Westfield	2018–19	Isthmian League South Central Division	8	0	—		—		—		8	0
Westfield	2019–20	Isthmian League South Central Division	19	1	1	0	—		7 (Note: Five appearances and one goal in the Alan Turvey Trophy, two appearances in the FA Trophy)	1	27	2
Westfield	Total		27	1	1	0	—		7	1	35	2
Hartley Wintney	2020–21	Southern League Premier Division South	6	0	4	0	—		1 (Note: Appearances in the FA Trophy)	0	11	0
Guildford City	2020–21	Combined Counties League Premier Division	1	0	—		—		0	0	1	0
Cray Wanderers	2021–22	Isthmian League Premier Division	4	0	1	0	—		0	0	5	0
Hendon	2021–22	Southern League Premier Division South	14	0	—		—		1	0	15	0
Metropolitan Police	2021–22	Southern League Premier Division South	2	0	—		—		—		2	0
Westfield	2021–22	Isthmian League South Central Division	5	0	—		—		—		5	0
Hartley Wintney	2022–23	Southern League Premier Division South	32	1	3	2	—		1	0	36	3
Walton & Hersham	2023–24	Southern League Premier Division South	29	5	0	0	—		2	0	31	5
Walton & Hersham	2024–25	Southern League Premier Division South	36	4	4	0	—		2 (Note: One appearance in the FA Trophy, one in the Southern League Premier Division South play-offs)	0	42	4
Walton & Hersham	2025–26	Southern League Premier Division South	34	1	3	2	—		5	2	42	5
Walton & Hersham	2026–27	National League South	1	0	0	0	—		0	0	1	0
Walton & Hersham	Total		100	10	7	2	—		9	2	116	14
Farnborough	2026–27	National League South	1	0	—		—		0	0	1	0
Career total			267	21	17	4	0	0	20	3	304	28
