= Kian Ryley =

English footballer (born 2005)

Personal information
- Full name: Kian Ryley
- Date of birth: 1 April 2005 (age 21)
- Position: Winger

Team information
- Current team: Solihull Moors
- Number: 25

Youth career
- 2019–2022: Solihull Moors

Senior career*
| Years | Team | Apps | (Gls) |
| 2022– | Solihull Moors | 9 | (0) |
| 2023 | → Hereford (loan) | 3 | (0) |
| 2023 | → Mickleover (loan) | 1 | (0) |
| 2024 | → Stourbridge (loan) | 15 | (2) |
| 2024 | → Brackley Town (loan) | 1 | (0) |
| 2024–2025 | → Rushall Olympic (loan) | 11 | (4) |
- * Club domestic league appearances and goals as of 21:47, 19 February 2025 (UTC)

Kian Ryley (born 1 April 2005) is an English professional footballer who plays as a winger for National League club Solihull Moors.

== Career ==
=== Solihull Moors ===
Ryley made his Moors debut on 20 December 2022, in a 2–0 FA Trophy third round win over AFC Telford United, in which he was awarded man of the match.

It was announced on 25 July 2023, that Ryley had signed his first professional contract with the club.

On 1 September 2023, Ryley joined National League North club Hereford on a one-month loan deal. He returned to Solihull on 27 September after making three appearances for Hereford.

On 10 November 2023, Ryley joined Southern League Premier Division Central club Mickleover on a 28-day youth loan, making his league debut the following day in a 1–1 draw against Needham Market.

In January 2024, Ryley joined Southern League Premier Division Central club Stourbridge on loan until the end of the season. He scored on his debut as a substitute with his first touch of the game to equalise and rescue a point for Stourbridge in a 1–1 draw.

On 5 November 2024, Ryley joined National League North club Brackley Town on an initial one-month loan deal. He made just one appearance for Brackley before returning to Solihull. On 20 December, he joined another National League North club in Rushall Olympic, again for one-month, before it was extended for the remainder of the season on 17 January 2025. However on 18 February, he was recalled from his loan spell at Rushall with immediate effect.

== Career statistics ==
As of match played 19 February 2025

Appearances and goals by club, season and competition
| Club | Season | League | | | FA Cup | | League Cup | | Other | | Total | |
| Club | Season | Division | Apps | Goals | Apps | Goals | Apps | Goals | Apps | Goals | Apps | Goals |
|---|---|---|---|---|---|---|---|---|---|---|---|---|
| Solihull Moors | 2022–23 | National League | 3 | 0 | 0 | 0 | — | | 2 (Note: Appearance(s) in FA Trophy) | 0 | 5 | 0 |
| Solihull Moors | 2023–24 | National League | 0 | 0 | 2 | 0 | — | | 1 | 1 | 3 | 1 |
| Solihull Moors | 2024–25 | National League | 6 | 0 | 2 | 0 | — | | 0 | 0 | 8 | 0 |
| Solihull Moors | Total | | 9 | 0 | 4 | 0 | 0 | 0 | 3 | 1 | 16 | 1 |
| Hereford (loan) | 2023–24 | National League North | 3 | 0 | 0 | 0 | — | | — | | 3 | 0 |
| Mickleover (loan) | 2023–24 | Southern Premier Central | 1 | 0 | — | | — | | 0 | 0 | 1 | 0 |
| Stourbridge (loan) | 2023–24 | Southern Premier Central | 15 | 2 | — | | — | | — | | 15 | 2 |
| Brackley Town (loan) | 2024–25 | National League North | 1 | 0 | 0 | 0 | — | | 0 | 0 | 1 | 0 |
| Rushall Olympic (loan) | 2024–25 | National League North | 11 | 4 | — | | — | | 0 | 0 | 11 | 4 |
| Career total | | | 40 | 6 | 4 | 0 | 0 | 0 | 3 | 1 | 47 | 7 |
