= AFC Telford United =

English football club

- Full name: AFC Telford United
- Nicknames: The Bucks; The Lilywhites
- Founded: 27 May 2004
- Ground: New Bucks Head, Telford
- Capacity: 6,380 (2,200 seated)
- Chairman: Ian Dosser
- Manager: Kevin Wilkin
- League: National League North
- 2025–26: National League North, 11th of 24
- Website: telfordunited.com
Home colours	Away colours	Third colours

AFC Telford United is a football club based in Telford, Shropshire, England. The club was formed in 2004 after the original Telford United, founded in 1872, folded due to financial problems. They are currently members of the National League North and play at the New Bucks Head in Wellington, part of the new town of Telford. The club's colours are white and black.

== History ==
Telford United experienced severe financial difficulties towards the end of the 2003–04 season while playing in the Football Conference following the collapse of the Miras Contracts business of chairman and sole shareholder Andy Shaw. The club went into administration, and although supporters raised around £50,000 in two months, the club's debts totalled over £4 million, resulting in liquidation on 27 May 2004. On the same day, Telford United Supporters Limited announced that a new club would be formed, which was named AFC Telford United; a new club motto, numquam obliviscere (never forget) was also adopted. In June the new club were placed in Division One of the Northern Premier League by the Football Association. Bernard McNally was appointed as manager and a new squad assembled.

The new club's first season saw them finish third in Division One, qualifying for the promotion play-offs. After beating Eastwood Town 1–0 in the semi-final, they defeated Kendal Town 2–1 in the final to earn promotion to the Premier Division. The attendance of 4,215 for the final was a club record. The following season saw them finish tenth. During the season, McNally was replaced as manager by Rob Smith. In 2006–07 the club finished third, having missed the chance to win the league when they lost 2–1 at home to eventual champions Burscough on the final day; the attendance of 5,710 being a new club record. However, they qualified for the promotion play-offs, and after a 2–0 win over Marine in the semi-final, they defeated Witton Albion 3–1 to earn promotion to the Conference North.

Telford finished second in the Conference North in 2007–08, again qualifying for the playoffs, in which they lost 4–0 on aggregate to Barrow. The 2008–09 season resulted in a fourth-place finish and another play-off campaign. After beating Alfreton Town 5–4 on aggregate in the semi-finals (a 2–0 win at home and a 4–3 defeat away), they lost 1–0 to Gateshead. The season also saw them reach the first round of the FA Cup for the first time, where they were drawn at home to Football League club Southend United. Following a 2–2 draw, the club lost 2–0 in the replay. In the FA Trophy they reached the semi-finals, losing 4–2 on aggregate to York City. However, they were victorious in the Conference League Cup, beating Forest Green Rovers 3–0 on penalties after a 0–0 draw.

In 2009–10 Telford finished eleventh in the league, resulting in the sacking of Smith and his replacement with Andy Sinton. Sinton's first season saw them finish as runners-up again. In the play-offs they defeated Nuneaton Town 3–2 on aggregate in the semi-final, before beating Guiseley 3–2 in the final with an injury-time winner by Phil Trainer, earning promotion to the Conference Premier. They also reached the first round of the FA Cup again, losing 3–1 at home to Lincoln City.

The 2011–12 season saw Telford finish twentieth, one place above the relegation zone. Another appearance in the first round of the FA Cup resulted in a 4–0 defeat at Chelmsford City. Sinton left the club mid-way through the following season, and was replaced by Mark Cooper, who remained in charge for only six games, before resigning to take a coaching role at Swindon Town. He was replaced by Graham Hyde, who lasted just two games, resigning after a defeat to Macclesfield Town. John Psaras took over for the remainder of the season, which saw them finish bottom of the division and be relegated to the Conference North. Liam Watson was appointed as manager in May 2013.

In 2013–14 Telford won the Conference North, earning an immediate return to the Conference Premier. However, the following season Watson was sacked in December with the club bottom of the division and replaced by Steve Kittrick. They finished 23rd, resulting in relegation back to the North division. However, the season also saw them reach the second round of the FA Cup for the first time; after beating Basingstoke Town 2–1 in a first round replay, they lost 1–0 at Bristol City. In August 2015 Kittrick was sacked and Rob Smith returned for a second spell as manager. They reached the first round of the FA Cup again in 2017–18 but lost 1–0 at Hereford. In 2022–23 the club finished bottom of the National League North and were relegated to the Premier Division Central of the Southern League. They were runners-up in the Premier Division Central the following season; in the subsequent play-offs the club defeated Mickleover 2–0 in the semi-finals, before losing 1–0 to Leamington in the final.

In 2024–25 Telford finished third in the Premier Division Central. They went on to beat Halesowen Town 3–2 in the play-off semi-finals and Kettering Town 4–2 in the final to earn promotion back to the National League North.

=== Season-by-season record ===
Season	Division	Tier	Pld	W	D	L	GF	GA	GD	Pts	Pos	FA Cup	FA Trophy	Notes
2004–05	Northern Premier League Division One	8	42	23	11	8	78	44	+34	80	3/22	Prelim	Prelim	Promoted
2005–06	Northern Premier League Premier Division	7	42	14	17	11	54	52	+2	59	10/22	2Q	3Q	
2006–07	Northern Premier League Premier Division	7	42	21	15	6	72	40	+32	78	3/22	1Q	1Q	Promoted
2007–08	Conference North	6	42	24	8	10	70	43	+27	80	2/22	2Q	1R	
2008–09	Conference North	6	42	22	10	10	65	34	+31	76	4/22	1R	SF	
2009–10	Conference North	6	40	14	9	17	52	55	−3	51	11/21	1R	3Q	
2010–11	Conference North	6	40	23	13	4	71	29	+42	82	2/21	3Q	3R	Promoted
2011–12	Conference Premier	5	46	10	16	20	45	65	−20	46	20/24	1R	2R	
2012–13	Conference Premier	5	46	6	17	23	52	79	−27	35	24/24	4Q	2R	Relegated
2013–14	Conference North	6	42	25	10	7	82	53	+29	85	1/22	2Q	1R	Champions, promoted
2014–15	Conference Premier	5	46	10	9	27	58	84	−26	36	23/24	2R	2R	Relegated
2015–16	National League North	6	42	13	8	21	47	60	−13	47	18/22	2Q	1R	
2016–17	National League North	6	42	10	12	20	38	57	−19	42	17/22	2Q	1R	
2017–18	National League North	6	42	16	5	21	55	69	−14	53	14/22	1R	1R	
2018–19	National League North	6	42	17	14	11	64	55	+9	65	8/22	3Q	SF	
2019–20	National League North	6	34	11	9	14	51	56	−5	42	14/22	2Q	1R	Season curtailed due to COVID-19 pandemic
2020–21	National League North	6	17	5	4	8	17	23	-6	19	14/22	3Q	3R	Season curtailed due to COVID-19 pandemic
2021–22	National League North	6	42	7	16	19	48	65	-17	37	20/22	2Q	3R	
2022–23	National League North	6	46	6	14	26	35	76	-41	32	24/24	2Q	3R	Relegated
2023–24	Southern League Premier Central Division	7	40	24	10	6	69	34	+35	82	2/21	1Q	3QR	
2024–25	Southern League Premier Central Division	7	42	19	17	6	82	60	+22	74	3/22	1Q	2R	Promoted
2025–26	National League North	6	42	17	14	15	88	65	20	65	11/22	1R	5R	

== Stadium ==
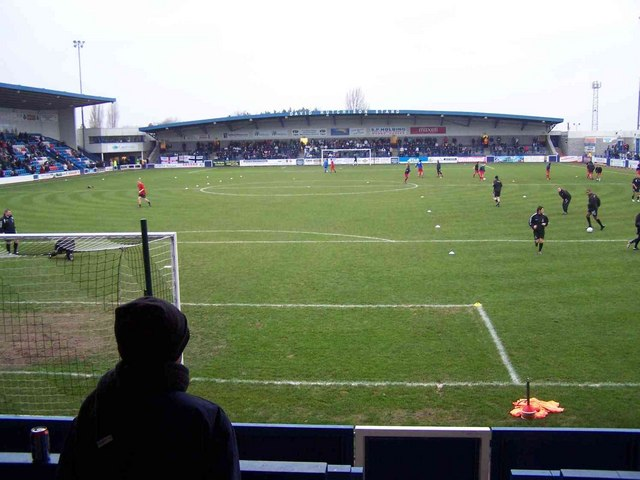
The New Bucks Head

Telford play their home games at the New Bucks Head. The ground was renamed following renovation in 2000, having previously been known as the Bucks Head. During the renovations Telford United played with only two terraces in operation, with a small temporary stand situated on what is now the East Terrace and portable cabins in the car park were used for changing rooms. It had previously been home to Wellington Town and Telford United.

The ground has a capacity of 6,380 of which 2,220 is seated and 4,800 covered. The club's record attendance at the ground is 5,710 against Burscough on 28 April 2007, the final day of the 2006–07 season.

== Rivalries ==
Shropshire rivals Shrewsbury Town are traditionally seen as the club's main rival. Matches contested between the two are known as the Shropshire derby. However, due to the league gap between the two clubs, most meetings between the two sides are in the Shropshire Senior Cup.

During United's time in the National League North through the late 2010s, a rivalry developed with near neighbours Kidderminster Harriers, based in North Worcestershire.

== Colours ==
Telford play in their traditional kit of white shirts and black shorts, similar to that of its predecessor Telford United F.C.. Their away and third kits often use the colours of red, blue (or a combination of the two), and yellow.

Since the club's reformation in 2004, the club has had a single main kit sponsor for its entire existence, that being Capgemini.

== Current squad ==
As of 4 September 2026

Note: Flags indicate national team as defined under FIFA eligibility rules; some limited exceptions apply. Players may hold more than one non-FIFA nationality.

No.	Pos.	Nation	Player
1	GK	ENG	Brandon Hall
2	DF	ENG	Matt Curley
3	DF	ENG	Jordan Cranston
4	DF	ENG	Zak Lilly
5	DF	ENG	Orrin Pendley
6	MF	ENG	Alex Fletcher (captain)
7	MF	ENG	Charlie Williams
8	MF	ENG	Dylan Mitchell
9	FW	ENG	Matty Stenson
10	FW	ENG	Jamie Meddows
11	MF	ENG	Jack Lambert

No.	Pos.	Nation	Player
12	FW	GER	Michael Gyasi
13	GK	WAL	Lewys Benjamin (on loan from Wolves)
14	MF	ENG	Sam McLintock
15	FW	WAL	Rio Owen (on loan from Wrexham)
16	DF	VEN	Oliver Cawthorne
18	DF	ENG	Mal Benning
19	MF	ENG	Kian Ryley (on loan from Solihull Moors)
22	DF	ENG	Taylor Anderson (on loan from Mansfield Town)
23	MF	ENG	Isaac England (on loan from Shrewsbury Town)
24	MF	ENG	Remi Walker
31	FW	ENG	Louis Moult

== Non-playing staff ==
- Manager: Kevin Wilkin
- Assistant manager: Mark Noon
- Sports Therapist: Adam Paget
- Youth Team Manager: Benjamin Sohier

=== Managerial history ===
Joined	Left	Manager
2004	2006	Bernard McNally
2006	2010	Rob Smith
2010	2013	Andy Sinton
2013	2013	Mark Cooper (interim)
2013	2013	Graham Hyde
2013	2013	John Psaras (caretaker)
2013	2014	Liam Watson
2014	2015	Steve Kittrick
2015	2017	Rob Smith
2017	2018	Rob Edwards
2018	2021	Gavin Cowan
2021	2021	Dennis Greene (Interim)
2021	2022	Paul Carden
2022	Present	Kevin Wilkin

== Honours ==
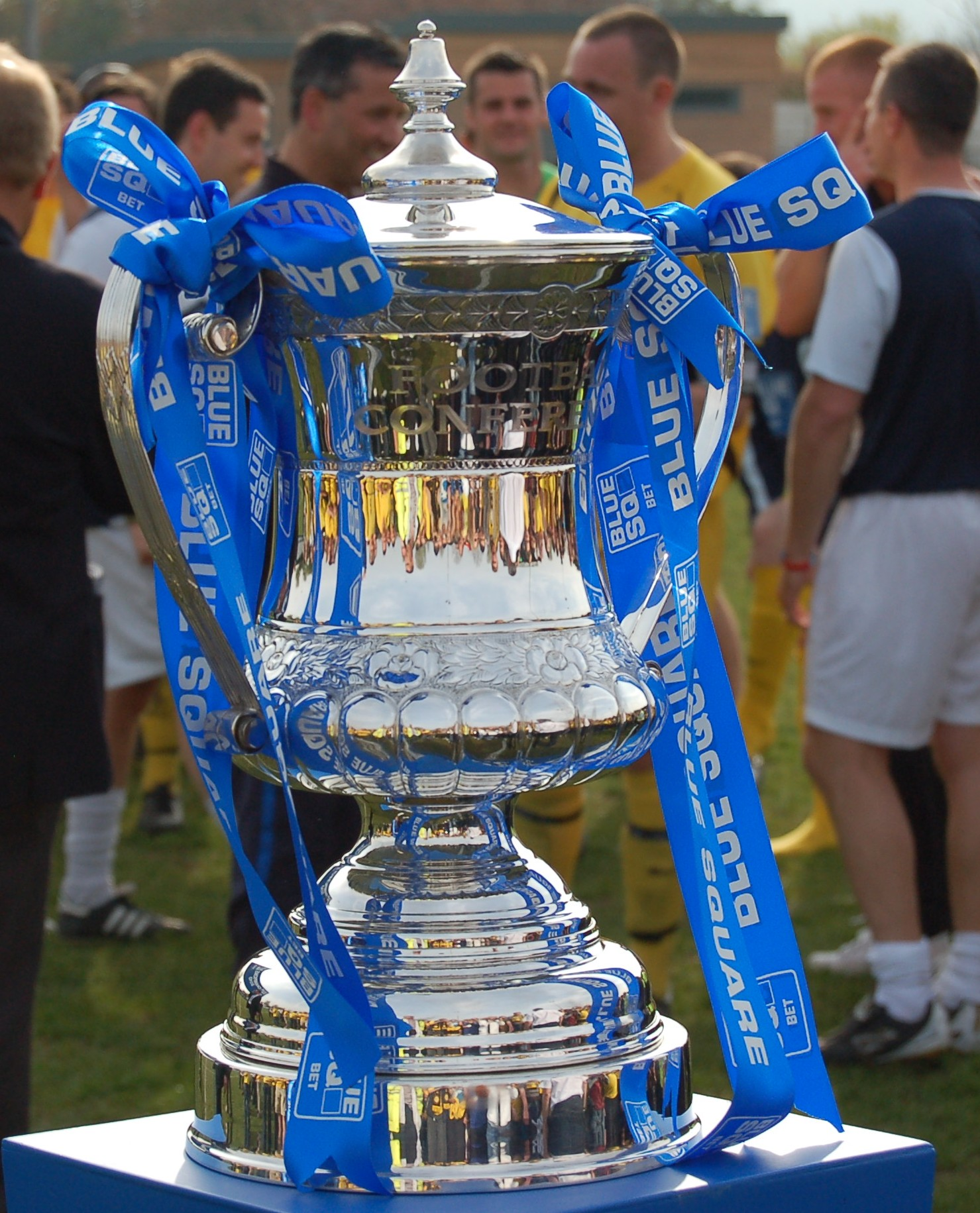
Conference North trophy

- Football Conference
  - Conference North champions 2013–14
  - League Cup winners 2008–09
- Supporters Direct Cup
  - Winners 2010–11
- Shropshire Senior Cup
  - Winners 2008–09, 2013–14, 2016–17
- The Huddersfield Cup
  - Winners 2018

== Records ==
- Highest league finish: 20th in Conference Premier (2011–12)
- Best FA Cup performance: Second round, 2014–15
- Best FA Trophy performance: Semi-finals, 2008–09, 2018–19
- Biggest victory: 10–1 vs Coleshill Town, FA Trophy second round, 15 December 2020
- Record defeat: 14–1 vs TNS, Shropshire Senior Cup, 20 July 2017
- Record home crowd: 5,710 vs Burscough, Northern Premier League Premier Division, 28 April 2007
- Longest unbeaten run: 37 matches, 21 January 2006 to 9 December 2006
- Most appearances: Ryan Young, 367, 2007–2014
- Most goals: Matty Stenson, 68, 2019–2020, 2024–26 (present)
- Most goals in a season: Matty Stenson, 31, 2024–25
- Most goals in a game: Matty Stenson, 5 vs Lowestoft Town, Southern League Premier Division Central, 18 April 2025
- Record transfer fee paid: £5,000, Lee Moore from Tamworth in December 2006
- Record transfer fee received: £25,000, Duane Courtney to Burnley, August 2005

== See also ==
- List of fan-owned sports teams
- AFC Telford United players
- AFC Telford United managers
