= Charlie Johnson (footballer) =

English footballer

Personal information
- Full name: Charles Edward Johnson
- Date of birth: 29 April 1884
- Place of birth: North Shields, England
- Date of death: 1954 (aged 74–75)
- Position: Full back

Senior career*
Years	Team	Apps	(Gls)
1900–1901	Hylton Rovers		
1901–1902	Wallsend Park Villa		
1903–1904	Willington Athletic		
1905–1910	Sheffield United	71	(0)
1910–1912	South Shields		
1912	Jarrow Caledonians		
1919–1920	South Shields	4	(0)
Total		75	(0)
- * Club domestic league appearances and goals

Charles Edward Johnson (29 April 1884–1954) was an English footballer who played in the Football League for Sheffield United and South Shields.
