= New Bucks Head =

Football stadium in Wellington, Shropshire, England

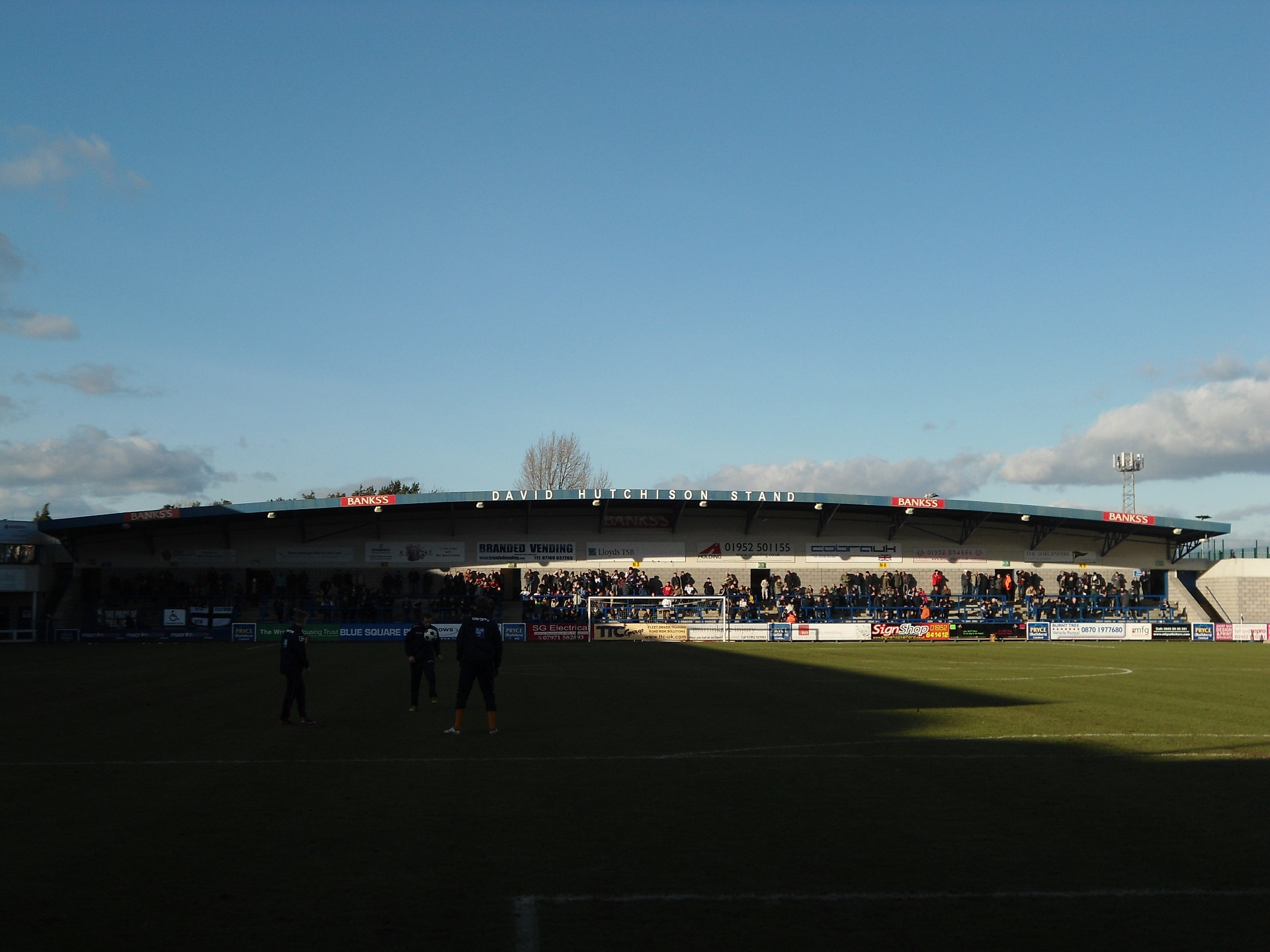
- David Hutchison Stand in 2013
- Interactive map of New Bucks Head
- Location: Wellington, Shropshire, England
- Coordinates: 52°41′51″N 2°30′05″W
- Owner: Telford and Wrekin Council
- Capacity: 6,300
- Surface: Grass
- Record attendance: 5,710 vs Burscough, April 28 2007
- Public transit: Wellington (0.9 mi)

Construction
- Opened: 2003

Tenants
- AFC Telford United (2004–present); Telford United (2003–2004); Wolverhampton Wanderers Women (2022-present)

Website
- www.telfordunited.com/the-club/seah-stadium/

New Bucks Head is a stadium in Wellington, Shropshire, England and the home of National League North football club AFC Telford United. It was originally built for Telford United to play at before they went bankrupt. The stadium is on the same site as the original Bucks Head, which had been home to Telford United formerly Wellington Town for over a century. The stadium was completed in 2003, and has a capacity of 6,320. It is covered on three out of four sides. The stadium lease and assets are currently held by Telford and Wrekin Council.

Until 2020, the stadium regularly hosted Wolverhampton Wanderers F.C. reserve fixtures. When Steven Gerrard returned from injury in the Liverpool Reserves it attracted one of the biggest crowds the stadium has ever seen. The stadium played host to the National Youth Lions Cup final in the 2006–07 season involving Sandiacre Town and Milton United. It has also been used for international football, hosting England U16's against Wales U16's in the Victory Shield.

== West Stand ==
The Sir Stephen Roberts Stand (Main Stand) is all seated and covered, with capacity for 2,200 spectators. At the top of the stand there are 10 corporate hospitality boxes. The stand houses the club's corporate and press facilities, as well as the gymnasium, swimming pool, bar and brasserie and reception sections of the Telford Whitehouse Hotel. The stand is named after former club chairman Sir Stephen Roberts, an entrepreneurial Shropshire farmer who served as chairman of the Milk Marketing Board for over a decade.

== Frank Nagington Stand ==
The Frank Nagington Stand is situated at the southern end of the stadium. This section was usually opened only when a larger than average crowd, or a particularly large away support, was expected. However it is now open at all games to away fans due to the higher number of travelling supporters.

== David Hutchison Stand ==
The David Hutchison or 'The Hutch' is where the more "die hard" fans stand and is the noisiest part of the stadium on matchdays. It is situated at the northern end of the ground and can hold a capacity of 1,100 spectators.

== UEFA Women's U17 Championships England 2013/14 ==
England was the selected country for the U17 Women's championship's in 2013/14. New Bucks Head, home to AFC Telford United was selected with three other stadiums in England to host the UEFA tournament. AFC Telford United was selected to host the opening ceremony, England's opening game of the tournament and another three group games.

== International Fixtures Played at New Bucks Head ==
Date		Result		Competition
29 September 2005	Scotland Women U19	11-0	Faroe Islands Women U19	UEFA Women's U19 Championship Qualifiers
29 September 2005	England Women U19	3-0	Croatia Women U19	UEFA Women's U19 Championship Qualifiers
14 October 2005	England U16	4–0	Wales U16	Sky Sports Victory Shield
2 November 2007	England U16	2–0	Wales U16	Sky Sports Victory Shield
4 March 2011	England School Boys	0–2	Northern Ireland School Boys	Centenary Shield
13 November 2012	England U19	1–0	Finland U19	Friendly
21 March 2013	England U19	1-0	Turkey U19	Friendly
26 November 2013	England Women U17	0-1	Italy Women U17	UEFA Women's U17 Championship Group A
26 November 2013	Austria Women U17	0-0	Portugal Women U17	UEFA Women's U17 Championship Group A
29 November 2013	Germany Women U17	4-0	France Women U17	UEFA Women's U17 Championship Group B
2 December 2013	Italy Women U17	0-1	Austria Women U17	UEFA Women's U17 Championship Group A
5 September 2014	England U20	6-0	Romania U20	Friendly
26 August 2015	England U17	3-0	Italy U17	St Georges Park Youth Tournament
31 September 2017	England U20	3-0	Netherlands U19	2017–18 Under 20 Elite League

== Gallery ==
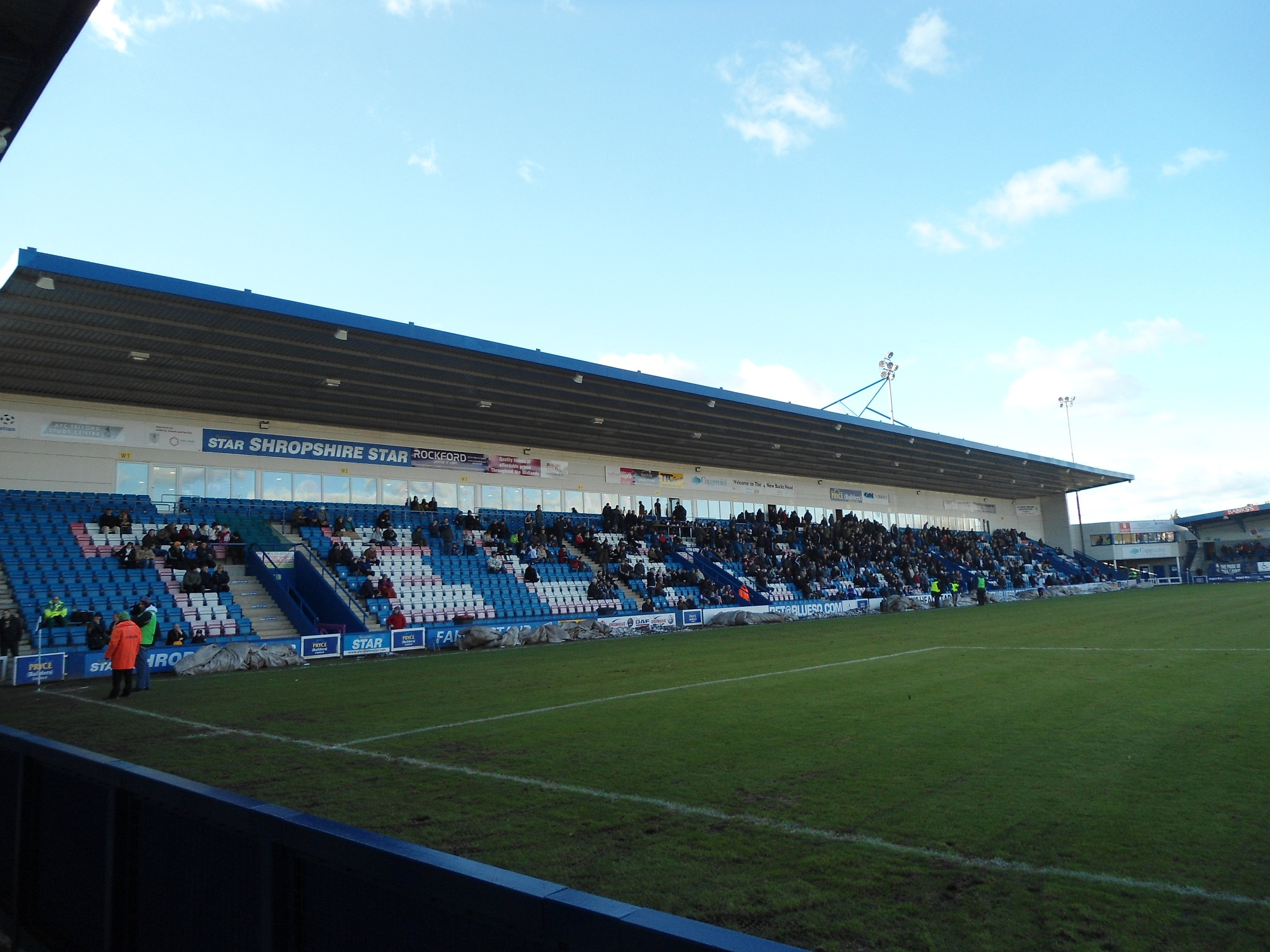
Stephen Roberts Stand, 2013

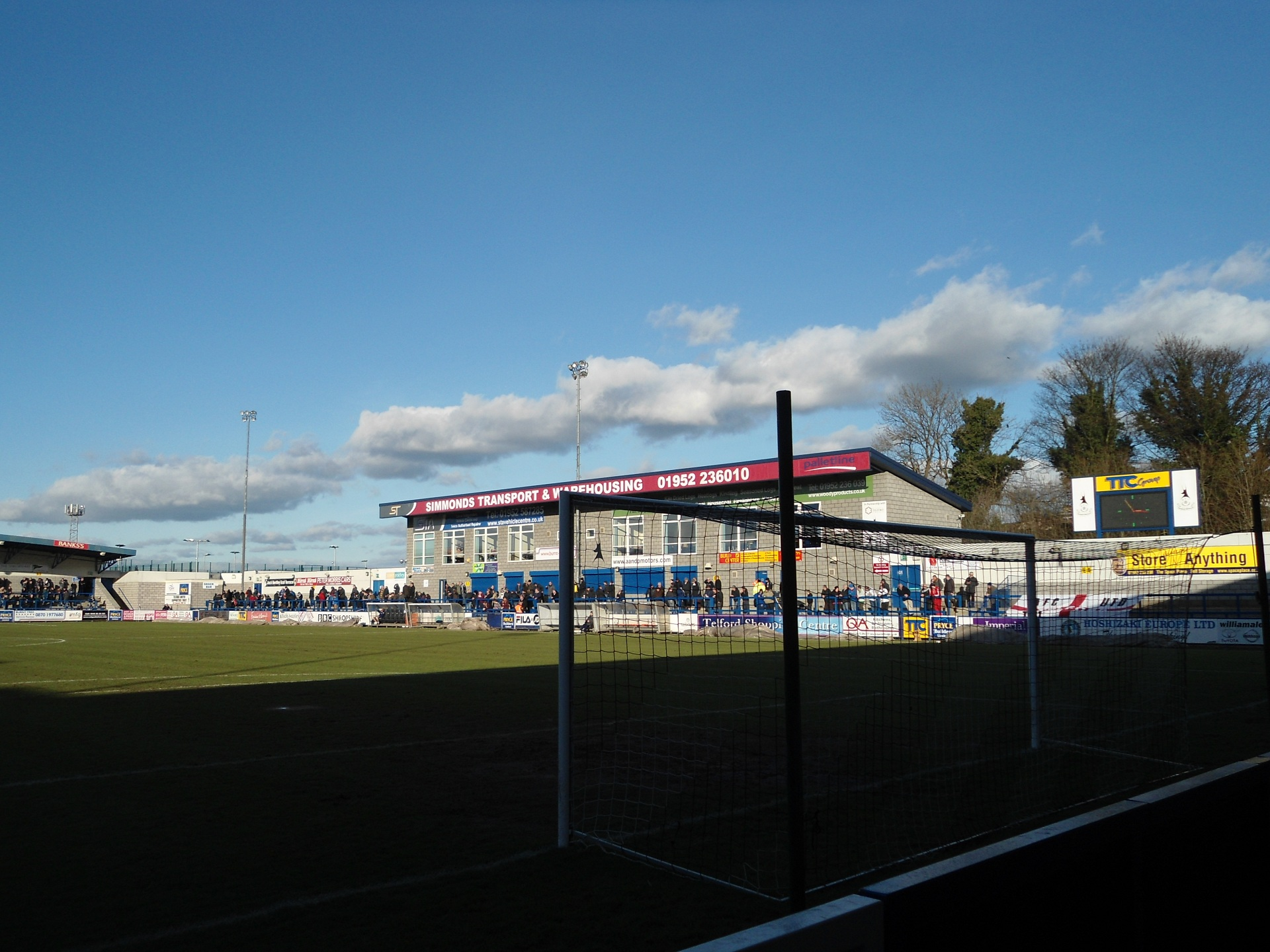
East side, 2013

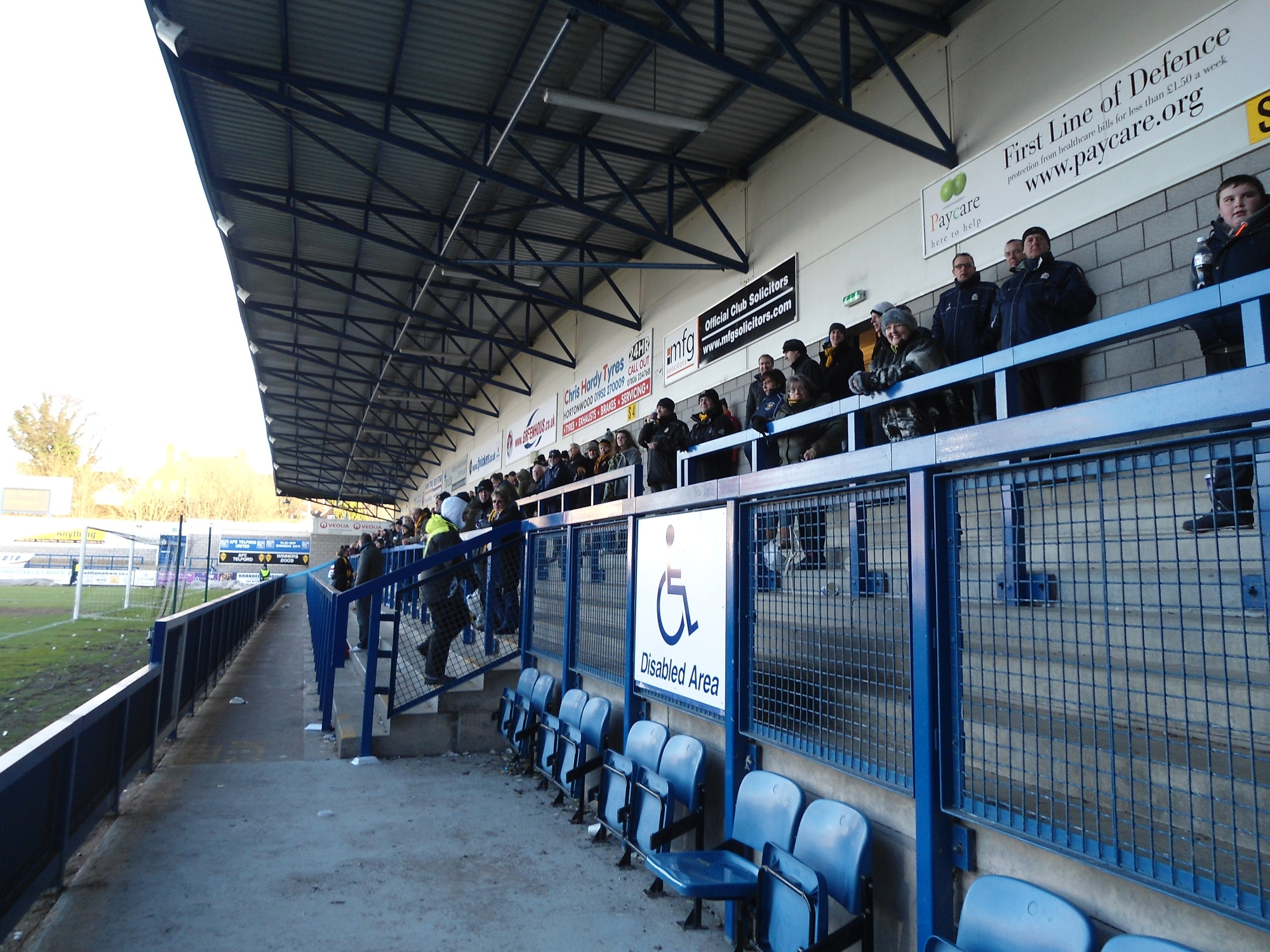
Frank Nagington Stand, 2013
