= 2023–24 Southern Football League =

The 2023–24 Southern Football League season was the 121st in the history of the Southern League since its establishment in 1894. The league has two Premier divisions (Central and South) at Step 3 of the National League System (NLS) and two Division One divisions (Central and South) at Step 4. These correspond to levels 7 and 8 of the English football league system.

The allocations for Steps 3 and 4 this season were announced by The Football Association (FA) on 15 May 2023. There were to be 84 teams in the Southern League, 22 in each of the Step 3 divisions and 20 in each of the Step 4 divisions. However, Marlow successfully appealed against their transfer from the Isthmian League leaving an unfilled vacancy in Division One Central, which therefore comprised 19 teams instead of 20.

== Premier Division Central ==
Southern Football League Premier Division Central
- Season: 2023–24
- Champions: Needham Market
- Promoted: Needham Market, Leamington
- Relegated: Hitchin Town (reprieved); Long Eaton United; Berkhamsted; Nuneaton Borough

Premier Division Central comprises 22 teams, 14 of which competed in the previous season.

=== Team changes ===
To the Premier Division Central

Relegated from the National League North

- AFC Telford United
- Kettering Town
- Leamington

Promoted from the Northern Premier League Division One Midlands

- Halesowen Town
- Stamford

Promoted from the Northern Premier League East Division

- Long Eaton United

Promoted from Division One Central

- Berkhamsted

Promoted from the Isthmian League North Division

- AFC Sudbury

From the Premier Division Central

Promoted to the National League North

- Tamworth
- Rushall Olympic

Transferred to the Northern Premier League Premier Division

- Basford United
- Ilkeston Town

Relegated to Division One Central

- Kings Langley
- Bedford Town

Relegated to the Northern Premier League Division One West

- Hednesford Town

Relegated to the Northern Premier League Division One Midlands

- AFC Rushden & Diamonds

=== Premier Division Central table ===
Pos	Team	Pld	W	D	L	GF	GA	GD	Pts	Promotion, qualification or relegation
1	Needham Market (C, P)	40	26	7	7	74	34	+40	85	Promotion to the National League North
2	AFC Telford United	40	24	10	6	69	34	+35	82	Qualification for the play-offs (Note: Four teams played for one spot and promotion to the National League.)
3	Leamington (O, P)	40	19	14	7	61	32	+29	71	Qualification for the play-offs
4	Redditch United	40	21	7	12	65	52	+13	70	Qualification for the play-offs
5	Mickleover	40	25	6	9	77	43	+34	69 (Note: Mickleover were deducted twelve points for fielding an ineligible player.)	Qualification for the play-offs and transferred to the Northern Premier League Premier Division (Note: Four teams played for one spot and promotion to the National League.)
6	Stratford Town	40	21	6	13	69	57	+12	69	
7	Stamford	40	19	9	12	80	58	+22	66	
8	Halesowen Town	40	18	8	14	54	50	+4	62	
9	St Ives Town	40	18	4	18	87	72	+15	58	
10	Royston Town	40	17	6	17	63	61	+2	57	
11	Coalville Town (R)	40	15	10	15	68	57	+11	55	Resignation to the United Counties League Division One
12	Stourbridge	40	14	10	16	52	50	+2	52	
13	Leiston	40	14	10	16	56	71	−15	52	
14	Barwell	40	13	12	15	64	65	−1	51	
15	Kettering Town	40	13	9	18	49	74	−25	48	
16	Alvechurch	40	12	9	19	49	70	−21	45	
17	Bromsgrove Sporting	40	12	8	20	44	51	−7	44	
18	AFC Sudbury	40	10	10	20	53	62	−9	40	
19	Hitchin Town	40	11	6	23	46	64	−18	39	Reprieve from relegation
20	Long Eaton United (R)	40	5	7	28	39	109	−70	22	Relegation to the Northern Premier League Division One Midlands
21	Berkhamsted (R)	40	3	12	25	31	84	−53	21	Relegation to Division One Central
22	Nuneaton Borough	0	0	0	0	0	0	0	0	Resignation to the Midland League Division One

Source: Southern League, Non League Matters
Rules for classification: 1) points; 2) goal difference; 3) number of goals scored; 4) number of matches won; 5) head-to-head results
(C) Champions; (O) Play-off winners; (P) Promoted; (R) Relegated

=== Results table ===
Home \ Away	SUD	TEL	ALV	BAR	BER	BRO	COA	HAL	HIT	KET	LEA	LEI	LOE	MIC	NEE	RED	ROY	STI	STA	STO	STR
AFC Sudbury	—	1–0	0–1	1–1	1–1	2–0	2–1	2–2	1–0	0–1	0–1	1–1	7–1	1–2	1–0	0–4	1–1	2–4	1–2	1–2	0–0
AFC Telford United	3–2	—	1–0	2–1	6–2	0–0	1–1	0–0	0–0	4–0	1–0	0–0	2–0	1–2	0–2	3–0	3–0	2–1	2–1	2–1	2–1
Alvechurch	1–0	0–2	—	4–4	1–1	1–0	1–4	0–2	2–1	1–1	1–0	0–2	2–1	1–2	0–3	4–4	1–0	1–4	4–3	1–0	1–0
Barwell	0–0	3–1	2–2	—	1–1	2–1	0–0	2–0	2–0	3–2	0–2	2–3	3–0	1–2	1–2	3–3	2–1	3–4	4–4	3–1	1–0
Berkhamsted	0–4	0–1	2–2	2–1	—	2–1	0–0	0–1	1–2	2–3	0–2	0–0	0–1	0–1	2–3	1–2	0–3	0–2	2–2	0–1	2–2
Bromsgrove Sporting	0–2	1–2	1–1	0–1	1–1	—	1–4	3–1	2–1	1–2	0–3	0–0	4–1	1–1	3–0	1–2	0–1	2–0	0–2	1–0	1–2
Coalville Town	0–3	1–4	2–1	3–1	9–0	1–0	—	1–1	1–0	3–1	5–2	1–2	1–1	1–0	1–6	2–0	1–1	0–1	1–2	0–0	1–1
Halesowen Town	4–1	0–2	1–0	1–1	2–1	2–1	2–1	—	1–3	1–2	0–0	2–1	5–0	2–1	0–1	1–2	0–3	4–3	2–0	1–0	2–0
Hitchin Town	2–1	1–1	2–0	0–0	1–3	1–2	4–3	0–1	—	0–1	1–2	1–4	2–3	2–2	0–2	2–2	1–2	3–2	1–2	0–0	3–4
Kettering Town	2–0	1–3	2–0	2–1	1–1	1–1	1–0	2–2	0–4	—	0–0	2–2	1–3	2–0	1–1	1–2	3–1	1–1	1–2	2–4	1–0
Leamington	2–0	1–1	1–1	1–1	4–0	2–0	1–1	1–0	3–0	2–1	—	1–1	2–1	0–1	0–1	3–0	3–1	3–1	3–0	2–1	1–1
Leiston	2–1	2–1	2–2	1–2	3–1	2–3	1–2	2–1	2–0	0–2	1–1	—	4–1	0–3	0–0	0–1	2–3	1–1	3–2	0–1	2–0
Long Eaton United	1–6	0–3	2–4	1–1	1–0	0–1	0–6	1–2	1–2	2–2	2–2	2–1	—	0–5	0–0	0–2	1–3	3–3	1–3	2–2	2–3
Mickleover	5–0	0–1	4–2	2–1	4–0	1–0	1–0	1–0	2–1	4–1	0–0	5–0	5–1	—	1–1	2–2	2–0	0–5	3–0	2–1	1–1
Needham Market	3–0	2–0	2–0	2–1	3–0	2–1	0–0	0–0	2–0	4–0	2–1	5–0	2–1	0–2	—	3–0	3–1	6–1	0–3	1–0	1–0
Redditch United	2–1	1–1	1–0	1–2	1–0	1–0	3–4	1–1	3–0	2–0	0–3	5–0	2–0	0–2	3–0	—	3–1	0–2	1–3	0–1	2–0
Royston Town	2–1	2–2	4–1	0–3	2–2	0–4	2–0	0–1	1–0	4–0	1–0	4–2	3–0	4–1	0–2	1–0	—	2–4	1–1	1–1	2–3
St Ives Town	1–1	2–3	3–2	3–1	1–0	0–1	1–2	4–2	1–2	6–0	0–1	5–0	5–0	0–2	3–2	2–3	3–2	—	1–4	4–1	1–3
Stamford	2–2	0–1	0–1	4–0	0–0	2–2	3–1	3–0	2–0	3–2	2–2	3–0	2–0	4–0	0–3	2–2	1–2	4–2	—	3–0	2–4
Stourbridge	1–1	2–2	1–0	2–0	6–0	1–1	4–2	3–4	0–2	2–1	1–1	1–3	3–0	3–1	1–1	0–1	1–0	2–0	1–1	—	0–1
Stratford Town	4–2	0–3	3–2	4–3	2–1	1–2	2–1	1–0	0–1	2–0	2–2	3–4	3–2	3–2	6–1	0–1	2–1	1–0	2–1	2–0	—

Source: Southern League
Legend: Blue = home team win; Yellow = draw; Red = away team win.

=== Play-offs ===
Semi-finals
2	AFC Telford United	2
5	Mickleover	0
3	Leamington	1
4	Redditch United	0

Final
2	AFC Telford United	0
3	Leamington	1

==== Semi-finals ====
1 May 2024	AFC Telford United	2–0	Mickleover	Wellington
19:45 BST	Gibson 40'; Walker 83'	Report		Stadium: New Bucks Head; Attendance: 3,004; Referee: Said Ouchene

1 May 2024	Leamington	1–0 (a.e.t.)	Redditch United	Leamington
19:45 BST	Edwards 106'	Report		Stadium: New Windmill Ground; Attendance: 1,155; Referee: Luke Scott

==== Final ====
6 May 2024	AFC Telford United	0–1	Leamington	Wellington
15:00 BST		Report	Williams 73'	Stadium: New Bucks Head; Attendance: 4,300; Referee: Richard Holmes

=== Stadia and locations ===
Locations of the Premier Division Central clubs
Locations of the Premier Division Central clubs nearby Worcestershire

Club	Location	Stadium	Capacity
AFC Sudbury	Sudbury	King's Marsh	2,500
AFC Telford United	Telford	New Bucks Head	6,300
Alvechurch	Alvechurch	Lye Meadow	3,000
Barwell	Barwell	Kirkby Road	2,500
Berkhamsted	Berkhamsted	Broadwater	2,500
Bromsgrove Sporting	Bromsgrove	Victoria Ground	4,893
Coalville Town	Coalville	Owen Street Sports Ground	2,000
Halesowen Town	Halesowen	The Grove	3,150
Hitchin Town	Hitchin	Top Field	4,554
Kettering Town	Kettering	Latimer Park (groundshare with Burton Park Wanderers)	2,400
Leamington	Leamington	New Windmill Ground	3,050
Leiston	Leiston	Victory Road	2,250
Long Eaton United	Long Eaton	Grange Park	3,000
Mickleover	Derby (Mickleover)	Station Road	1,500
Needham Market	Needham Market	Bloomfields	4,000
Nuneaton Borough	Nuneaton	Liberty Way	4,614
Redditch United	Redditch	The Valley	5,000
Royston Town	Royston	Garden Walk	5,000
Stamford	Stamford	Borderville Sports Centre	2,000
St Ives Town	St Ives	Westwood Road	2,000
Stourbridge	Stourbridge	War Memorial Athletic Ground	2,626
Stratford Town	Stratford-upon-Avon	Knights Lane	2,000

=== Top goalscorers ===
Rank	Player	Club	Goals
1	Jonathan Edwards	St. Ives Town	27
2	Callum Ebanks	Stratford Town	27
3	Oliver Greaves	Mickleover	18
4	Callum Stewart	Leamington	17
4	Miracle Okafor	Halesowen Town	17
6	Timothy Berridge	Coalville Town	16
7	Alex Cameron	Redditch United	15
7	Jamar Loza	Leiston	15
7	Brady Hickey	Barwell	15
7	Jamie McGrath	Needham Market	15
11	Reece Flanagan	Redditch United	14
12	Beck-Ray Enoru	Barwell	13

== Premier Division South ==
Southern Football League Premier Division South
- Season: 2023–24
- Champions: Chesham United
- Promoted: Chesham United; Salisbury
- Relegated: Beaconsfield Town; Hayes & Yeading United; Harrow Borough; Didcot Town

Premier Division South comprises 22 teams, 16 of which competed in the previous season.

=== Team changes ===
To the Premier Division South

Promoted from Division One Central

- Didcot Town

Promoted from Division One South

- AFC Totton
- Sholing

Promoted from the Isthmian League South Central Division

- Basingstoke Town
- Walton & Hersham

Relegated from the National League South

- Hungerford Town

From the Premier Division South

Promoted to the National League South

- Truro City
- Weston-super-Mare

Relegated to Division One Central

- North Leigh

Relegated to Division One South

- Yate Town

Relegated to the Isthmian League South Central Division

- Hartley Wintney
- Metropolitan Police

=== Premier Division South table ===
Pos	Team	Pld	W	D	L	GF	GA	GD	Pts	Promotion, qualification or relegation
1	Chesham United (C, P)	42	28	6	8	83	46	+37	90	Promotion to the National League South
2	AFC Totton	42	23	12	7	89	45	+44	81	Qualification for the play-offs (Note: Four teams play for one spot and promotion to the National League.)
3	Salisbury (O, P)	42	23	10	9	70	46	+24	79	Qualification for the play-offs
4	Gosport Borough	42	23	9	10	75	43	+32	78	Qualification for the play-offs
5	Bracknell Town	42	21	5	16	84	71	+13	68	Qualification for the play-offs
6	Merthyr Town	42	20	7	15	85	59	+26	67	
7	Walton & Hersham	42	18	11	13	78	67	+11	65	
8	Hungerford Town	42	18	10	14	77	70	+7	64	
9	Dorchester Town	42	17	9	16	66	77	−11	60	
10	Hendon	42	14	16	12	70	65	+5	58	Transferred to the Isthmian League Premier Division
11	Winchester City	42	15	12	15	63	67	−4	57	
12	Basingstoke Town	42	15	8	19	69	83	−14	53	
13	Poole Town	42	16	4	22	70	76	−6	52	
14	Tiverton Town	42	14	10	18	64	74	−10	52	
15	Sholing	42	13	10	19	52	63	−11	49	
16	Swindon Supermarine	42	13	10	19	73	92	−19	49	
17	Hanwell Town	42	12	12	18	64	71	−7	48	
18	Plymouth Parkway	42	12	12	18	60	68	−8	48	
19	Beaconsfield Town (R)	42	13	9	20	63	78	−15	48	Relegation to Division One Central
20	Hayes & Yeading United (R)	42	11	13	18	59	67	−8	46	Relegation to the Isthmian League South Central Division
21	Harrow Borough (R)	42	10	9	23	60	97	−37	39	Relegation to the Isthmian League South Central Division
22	Didcot Town (R)	42	6	10	26	45	94	−49	28	Relegation to Division One South

Source: Southern League, Non League Matters
Rules for classification: 1) points; 2) goal difference; 3) number of goals scored; 4) number of matches won; 5) head-to-head results
(C) Champions; (O) Play-off winners; (P) Promoted; (R) Relegated

=== Results table ===
Home \ Away	TOT	BAS	BEA	BRA	CHE	DID	DOR	GOS	HAN	HAB	HAY	HEN	HUN	MER	PLY	POO	SAL	SHO	SWI	TIV	W&H	WIN
AFC Totton	—	2–2	3–0	3–2	2–2	7–1	4–4	1–1	5–3	1–0	2–1	1–1	1–2	2–0	2–0	1–0	0–2	1–3	3–1	5–0	3–0	1–1
Basingstoke Town	3–2	—	1–1	1–3	1–1	2–4	3–1	3–0	1–3	5–0	0–3	3–2	2–2	1–3	1–0	4–2	0–0	1–2	4–3	3–2	3–3	0–2
Beaconsfield Town	0–2	2–3	—	3–0	1–2	2–1	3–4	1–2	1–0	3–1	2–3	2–2	3–3	0–5	1–1	1–3	0–0	2–1	3–4	2–3	2–1	1–2
Bracknell Town	1–5	4–0	0–3	—	4–0	5–1	1–3	4–3	3–1	1–1	3–3	1–0	3–1	3–2	2–0	1–1	2–1	5–1	5–0	3–0	3–0	3–1
Chesham United	2–0	2–0	3–0	1–2	—	1–1	2–0	2–0	1–1	4–0	1–0	2–1	2–1	2–1	4–3	3–1	2–1	2–1	4–0	2–0	3–0	1–2
Didcot Town	0–1	2–3	0–1	1–0	1–1	—	0–1	0–4	1–3	2–2	0–1	1–2	0–1	1–2	3–2	0–7	1–2	0–1	0–2	0–0	1–1	1–0
Dorchester Town	0–4	4–1	2–1	1–2	0–2	3–1	—	0–3	2–1	2–2	1–1	2–2	2–4	3–2	0–0	1–2	1–0	1–2	2–1	2–1	1–2	0–4
Gosport Borough	2–0	4–1	1–2	2–0	4–2	0–0	2–2	—	3–2	1–0	1–2	2–1	4–0	2–1	1–1	1–2	1–1	1–0	1–2	2–1	2–2	2–1
Hanwell Town	0–0	1–2	2–0	1–2	0–3	2–0	1–1	0–0	—	2–1	1–1	2–2	1–0	1–4	4–0	0–3	2–3	2–3	1–2	1–2	1–2	4–4
Harrow Borough	1–2	4–2	2–1	1–4	1–4	3–3	0–2	2–0	0–3	—	1–1	1–3	1–6	1–2	2–1	2–4	2–3	3–2	2–2	1–2	1–4	1–2
Hayes & Yeading United	0–1	1–0	1–3	3–2	1–2	1–2	0–1	0–3	1–3	3–0	—	0–0	3–2	1–1	0–2	5–3	0–2	0–0	2–2	5–2	0–0	1–3
Hendon	3–3	2–0	4–5	1–1	0–1	3–1	1–0	0–0	3–3	2–2	4–3	—	2–2	1–0	0–2	2–0	0–0	3–1	2–3	2–3	1–1	2–1
Hungerford Town	1–0	1–0	3–1	3–1	0–1	2–2	1–1	0–2	2–2	2–1	3–3	3–0	—	1–1	7–0	2–1	1–0	2–1	3–2	1–2	0–1	2–2
Merthyr Town	1–3	4–1	2–3	2–3	1–3	4–0	3–2	1–4	4–0	7–1	1–1	1–1	3–0	—	1–1	0–2	2–1	2–1	4–1	2–1	1–1	1–2
Plymouth Parkway	0–3	1–1	0–1	1–0	4–0	2–1	5–0	0–2	1–2	1–3	3–1	3–0	6–2	1–3	—	1–0	0–1	1–3	4–1	1–1	2–2	1–1
Poole Town	0–0	0–1	3–0	3–1	2–5	2–0	1–2	2–0	0–3	1–0	0–2	2–2	1–2	1–3	2–2	—	4–5	0–3	1–0	2–0	1–3	2–1
Salisbury	0–1	2–1	1–1	2–0	3–1	2–2	3–2	2–0	2–0	0–2	2–1	2–1	2–1	0–0	2–1	2–0	—	3–0	3–2	4–2	1–0	2–2
Sholing	0–0	0–4	0–0	0–0	0–1	2–2	1–2	0–3	1–1	1–3	1–0	2–2	3–3	0–2	1–1	2–0	2–1	—	3–0	0–4	0–1	5–1
Swindon Supermarine	2–2	3–0	3–3	3–1	2–1	4–1	1–2	0–2	1–1	1–3	3–2	0–1	2–3	0–3	3–0	2–7	3–3	0–0	—	2–2	2–1	3–0
Tiverton Town	1–2	2–2	2–2	2–1	2–0	5–3	0–2	1–2	2–0	0–0	1–1	2–4	0–1	2–0	2–2	4–2	1–3	1–0	1–1	—	2–2	2–0
Walton & Hersham	2–2	1–2	1–0	5–2	2–2	4–2	6–3	0–4	1–2	4–4	2–0	1–3	4–1	2–3	1–2	3–0	1–0	1–0	4–2	2–0	—	3–1
Winchester City	0–6	2–1	1–0	5–0	0–3	1–2	1–1	1–1	1–1	1–2	1–1	0–2	1–0	2–0	1–1	4–0	1–1	1–3	2–2	2–1	2–1	—

Source: Southern League
Legend: Blue = home team win; Yellow = draw; Red = away team win.

=== Play-offs ===
Semi-finals
2	AFC Totton	2
5	Bracknell Town	1
3	Salisbury	2
4	Gosport Borough	1

Final
2	AFC Totton	2 (3)
3	Salisbury	2 (4)

==== Semi-finals ====
1 May	AFC Totton	2–1 (a.e.t.)	Bracknell Town	Totton
19:45	Lee 65'; Taylor 108'	Report	Jackson 87'	Stadium: Testwood Stadium; Attendance: 1,023; Referee: Will Briers

1 May	Salisbury	2–1	Gosport Borough	Salisbury
19:45	Hedges 87'; Coppin 90+1' (pen.)	Report	Wassmer 70'	Stadium: Raymond McEnhill Stadium; Attendance: 2,234; Referee: Steven Swan

==== Final ====
6 May	AFC Totton	2–2 (a.e.t.) (3–4 p)	Salisbury	Totton
15:00	Lee 78'; Taylor 116'	Report	Coppin 86' (pen.); Hedges 104'	Stadium: Testwood Stadium; Attendance: 2,061; Referee: Callum Jones

=== Stadia and locations ===
Locations of the Premier Division South clubs
Greater London and environ Premier Division South clubs

Club	Location	Stadium	Capacity
AFC Totton	Totton	Testwood Stadium	3,000
Basingstoke Town	Basingstoke	Winklebury Football Complex (Basingstoke)	2,000
Beaconsfield Town	Beaconsfield	Holloways Park	3,500
Bracknell Town	Sandhurst	SB Stadium	1,950
Chesham United	Chesham	The Meadow	5,000
Didcot Town	Didcot	Loop Meadow	3,000
Dorchester Town	Dorchester	The Avenue Stadium	5,000
Gosport Borough	Gosport	Privett Park	4,500
Hanwell Town	Perivale	Powerday Stadium	3,000
Harrow Borough	Harrow	Earlsmead Stadium	3,000
Hayes & Yeading United	Hayes, Hillingdon	SkyEx Community Stadium	3,000
Hendon	Hendon	Silver Jubilee Park	2,000
Hungerford Town	Hungerford	Bulpit Lane	2,500
Merthyr Town	Merthyr Tydfil	Penydarren Park	4,000
Plymouth Parkway	Plymouth	Bolitho Park	3,500
Poole Town	Poole	The BlackGold Stadium	2,500
Salisbury	Salisbury	Raymond McEnhill Stadium	5,000
Sholing	Sholing	Universal Stadium	1,000
Swindon Supermarine	South Marston	Hunts Copse Ground	3,000
Tiverton Town	Tiverton	Ladysmead	3,500
Walton & Hersham	Walton-on-Thames	Elmbridge Sports Hub	2,500
Winchester City	Winchester	The City Ground	4,500

== Division One Central ==
Southern Football League Division One Central
- Season: 2023–24
- Champions: Biggleswade Town
- Promoted: Biggleswade Town
- Relegated: Kempston Rovers

Division One Central comprises 19 teams, 14 of which competed in the previous season. It had been intended that there be 20 teams, but Marlow, due to have transferred from the Isthmian League, successfully appealed against the transfer.

=== Team changes ===
To Division One Central

Promoted from the Spartan South Midlands League Premier Division

- Leighton Town
- Stotfold

Relegated from the Premier Division South

- North Leigh

Relegated from the Premier Division Central

- Bedford Town
- Kings Langley

From Division One Central

Promoted to the Premier Division Central

- Berkhamsted

Promoted to the Premier Division South

- Didcot Town

Transferred to the Isthmian League North Division

- Walthamstow

Relegated to the Hellenic League Premier Division

- Highworth Town

Relegated to the Spartan South Midlands League Premier Division

- FC Romania

Resigned to the Eastern Counties League Division One South

- Harlow Town

=== Division One Central table ===
Pos	Team	Pld	W	D	L	GF	GA	GD	Pts	Promotion, qualification or relegation
1	Biggleswade Town (C, P)	36	22	6	8	77	39	+38	72	Promotion to the Premier Division Central
2	Bedford Town (O, P)	36	20	9	7	78	37	+41	69	Qualified for the play-offs, then promoted to the Premier Division Central
3	AFC Dunstable	36	20	4	12	77	66	+11	64	Qualification for the play-offs (Note: Four teams play for one spot and possible promotion to Step 3.)
4	Waltham Abbey	36	18	7	11	70	55	+15	61	Qualification for the play-offs, then transfer to the Isthmian League North Division
5	Ware	36	18	5	13	69	61	+8	59	Qualification for the play-offs
6	Cirencester Town (R)	36	16	9	11	66	44	+22	57	Resigned and demoted to the Hellenic League
7	Stotfold	36	16	7	13	67	56	+11	55	
8	Hadley	36	17	4	15	64	60	+4	55	
9	Welwyn Garden City	36	17	3	16	79	79	0	54	
10	Biggleswade	36	14	6	16	62	58	+4	48	
11	Kings Langley	36	13	9	14	71	74	−3	48	
12	Barton Rovers	36	11	11	14	58	65	−7	44	
13	Kidlington	36	12	8	16	49	60	−11	44	
14	Hertford Town	36	13	5	18	55	73	−18	44	
15	Aylesbury United	36	12	7	17	61	74	−13	43	
16	North Leigh	36	14	1	21	52	80	−28	43	
17	Leighton Town	36	12	6	18	51	62	−11	42	
18	Thame United	36	11	4	21	51	70	−19	37	Reprieve from relegation (Note: Nuneaton Borough resigned from the Southern League. Because of this, Thame United were reprieved from relegation.)
19	Kempston Rovers (R)	36	8	5	23	36	80	−44	29	Relegation to the Spartan South Midlands League

Source: Southern League, Non League Matters
Rules for classification: 1) points; 2) goal difference; 3) number of goals scored; 4) number of matches won; 5) head-to-head results
(C) Champions; (O) Play-off winners; (P) Promoted; (R) Relegated

=== Results table ===
Home \ Away	DUN	AYU	BAR	BDT	BIG	BIT	CIR	HAD	HER	KEM	KID	KLL	LEI	NOR	STO	THM	WAA	WAR	WGC
AFC Dunstable	—	1–2	4–0	1–3	3–2	1–0	2–3	2–1	4–1	2–1	2–0	5–6	4–4	2–4	2–0	2–1	2–5	1–3	1–0
Aylesbury United	2–1	—	0–4	0–0	1–0	1–3	1–3	2–3	1–2	0–0	2–2	1–2	2–4	2–0	4–4	1–2	3–2	0–0	3–2
Barton Rovers	3–0	4–2	—	0–0	1–2	0–3	1–3	5–2	2–1	2–2	1–4	3–3	2–0	1–1	0–3	2–2	0–0	2–1	3–2
Bedford Town	0–3	1–2	2–0	—	2–1	2–3	3–1	2–3	7–0	2–0	5–1	1–1	1–1	4–0	1–1	3–2	0–1	7–1	5–1
Biggleswade	2–3	2–0	2–2	2–2	—	1–2	1–1	4–3	1–2	4–1	1–1	2–0	1–2	1–2	3–1	0–2	0–1	4–0	4–5
Biggleswade Town	2–2	2–1	3–2	0–1	2–0	—	1–2	2–2	2–3	0–1	3–1	2–0	1–1	3–0	3–3	1–0	2–3	4–1	4–3
Cirencester Town	2–2	2–1	3–0	1–1	1–2	1–4	—	3–0	3–1	4–0	0–1	1–1	2–2	3–0	2–2	3–0	4–1	0–1	3–0
Hadley	1–0	1–2	1–3	0–1	2–1	0–2	1–0	—	3–1	1–0	0–3	2–1	0–1	6–0	2–1	3–0	4–3	0–0	3–2
Hertford Town	1–2	2–2	0–0	0–2	2–0	2–2	2–3	4–2	—	3–1	1–1	4–2	1–3	2–1	1–3	5–1	2–1	0–2	1–2
Kempston Rovers	0–2	0–5	2–2	2–1	1–3	0–3	1–3	1–6	1–4	—	0–0	0–3	2–0	1–2	1–4	1–0	0–0	4–2	1–2
Kidlington	2–3	3–1	1–0	1–1	1–2	0–4	4–3	0–0	2–0	0–1	—	2–2	4–1	4–2	1–3	2–1	3–3	1–0	0–2
Kings Langley	4–2	2–0	2–2	1–3	1–2	2–2	1–1	1–1	1–0	6–2	4–2	—	0–3	5–1	2–2	3–1	1–2	4–1	2–4
Leighton Town	1–2	4–1	2–0	0–2	0–2	0–1	0–0	1–2	3–2	1–3	1–0	0–1	—	1–2	5–1	3–1	0–0	0–4	1–4
North Leigh	3–0	2–3	3–4	1–4	0–3	0–4	2–1	0–2	1–3	0–2	3–0	4–1	3–0	—	1–4	3–0	1–0	1–3	1–2
Stotfold	0–1	4–3	1–0	0–2	6–0	1–3	2–1	2–0	5–0	2–1	1–0	2–1	2–0	0–2	—	0–2	0–2	1–1	3–1
Thame United	3–3	3–1	1–3	1–2	1–1	1–0	0–2	2–1	0–1	1–0	1–2	3–0	1–3	3–0	2–1	—	2–4	1–3	0–1
Waltham Abbey	2–6	2–3	1–1	0–0	1–1	1–0	1–0	2–3	5–1	3–1	2–0	2–4	2–1	4–0	2–1	3–2	—	4–1	1–4
Ware	1–2	2–3	3–1	4–2	1–0	0–1	1–0	4–2	1–0	3–0	2–0	3–0	5–1	1–3	1–1	4–4	1–0	—	4–2
Welwyn Garden City	1–2	3–3	3–2	1–3	2–5	0–3	1–1	2–1	0–0	4–2	2–0	6–1	2–1	1–3	3–0	3–4	1–4	5–4	—

Source: Southern League
Legend: Blue = home team win; Yellow = draw; Red = away team win.

=== Play-offs ===
Semi-finals
2	Bedford Town	2
5	Ware	1
3	AFC Dunstable	3 (7)
4	Waltham Abbey	3 (8)

Final
2	Bedford Town	2
4	Waltham Abbey	1

==== Semi-finals ====
1 May	Bedford Town	2–1	Ware	Cardington
19:45	Green (yellow card) 1'; Collard 36'; Blake (yellow card) 42'; Lobjoit 45+4'; Martin (yellow card) 86'	Report	Bishop 90+6'	Stadium: The New Eyrie; Attendance: 1,053

1 May	AFC Dunstable	3–3 (a.e.t.) (7-8 p)	Waltham Abbey	Dunstable
19:45	Matshazi 49', 62'; Idiakhoa (yellow card) 56'; Greco 115' (pen.)	Report	Akubuine 45+5' (yellow card) 120+2'; Eyoma (yellow card) 45+6' (goal) 90+10'; Baker (yellow card) 53'; Hallett (yellow card) 54'; Koranteng (yellow card) 54'; Rydings (yellow card) 60'; Ogunnowo 112'	Stadium: Creasey Park; Attendance: 525
	Penalties
	Penalty scored Penalty missed		Penalty scored Penalty missed

==== Final ====
6 May	Bedford Town	2–1	Waltham Abbey	Cardington
15:00	Connolly 21' (yellow card) 82'; Mensah 73' (yellow card) 78'; Martin (yellow card) 74'	Report	Eyoma 42'; Cathline (yellow card) 65'	Stadium: The New Eyrie; Attendance: 2,052

=== Stadia and locations ===
Locations of Division One Central clubs

Club	Location	Stadium	Capacity
AFC Dunstable	Dunstable	Creasey Park	3,200
Aylesbury United	Chesham	The Meadow (groundshare with Chesham United)	5,000
Barton Rovers	Barton-le-Clay	Sharpenhoe Road	4,000
Bedford Town	Bedford	The Eyrie	3,000
Biggleswade	Biggleswade	The Eyrie (groundshare with Bedford Town)	3,000
Biggleswade Town	Biggleswade	Langford Road	3,000
Cirencester Town	Cirencester	Corinium Stadium	4,500
Hadley	London (Arkley)	Brickfield Lane	2,000
Hertford Town	Hertford	Hertingfordbury Park	6,500
Kempston Rovers	Kempston	Hillgrounds Leisure	2,000
Kidlington	Kidlington	Yarnton Road	1,500
Kings Langley	Kings Langley	Sadiku Stadium	1,963
Leighton Town	Leighton Buzzard	Bell Close	2,800
North Leigh	North Leigh	Eynsham Hall Park Sports Ground	2,000
Stotfold	Stotfold	The JSJ Stadium	1,500
Thame United	Thame	Meadow View Park	2,000
Waltham Abbey	Waltham Abbey	Capershotts	3,500
Ware	Ware	Wodson Park	3,300
Welwyn Garden City	Welwyn Garden City	Herns Way	1,000

== Division One South ==
Southern Football League Division One South
- Season: 2023–24
- Champions: Wimborne Town
- Promoted: Wimborne Town; Frome Town
- Relegated: Paulton Rovers

Division One South comprises 20 teams, 15 of which competed in the previous season.

=== Team changes ===
To Division One South

Promoted from the Hellenic League Premier Division

- Cribbs
- Malvern Town

Promoted from the Wessex League Premier Division

- Bemerton Heath Harlequins

Promoted from the Western League Premier Division

- Mousehole

Relegated from the Premier Division South

- Yate Town

From Division One South

Promoted to the Premier Division South

- AFC Totton
- Sholing

Relegated to the Hellenic League Premier Division

- Cinderford Town
- Slimbridge

Relegated to the Wessex League Premier Division

- Lymington Town

=== Division One South table ===
Pos	Team	Pld	W	D	L	GF	GA	GD	Pts	Promotion, qualification or relegation
1	Wimborne Town (C, P)	36	24	7	5	76	42	+34	79	Promotion to the Premier Division South
2	Frome Town (O, P)	36	22	9	5	74	42	+32	75	Qualified for the play-offs, then promoted to the Premier Division South
3	Cribbs	36	18	12	6	56	46	+10	66	Qualification for the play-offs (Note: Four teams play for one spot and possible promotion to Step 3.)
4	Bristol Manor Farm	36	17	8	11	67	50	+17	59	Qualification for the play-offs
5	Mousehole	36	17	7	12	82	58	+24	58	Qualification for the play-offs
6	Larkhall Athletic	36	16	10	10	67	53	+14	58	
7	Evesham United	36	13	12	11	56	47	+9	51	
8	Yate Town	36	13	11	12	56	46	+10	50	
9	Bishop's Cleeve	36	13	9	14	68	63	+5	48	
10	Malvern Town	36	13	8	15	59	61	−2	47	
11	Tavistock	36	13	7	16	62	71	−9	46	
12	Bideford	36	13	7	16	46	58	−12	46	
13	Bemerton Heath Harlequins	36	12	7	17	52	71	−19	43	
14	Willand Rovers	36	11	9	16	50	60	−10	42	
15	Bashley	36	11	9	16	45	59	−14	42	
16	Melksham Town	36	10	10	16	52	65	−13	40	
17	Westbury United	36	8	10	18	45	62	−17	34	
18	Exmouth Town	36	9	6	21	49	67	−18	33	
19	Paulton Rovers (R)	36	6	8	22	37	78	−41	26	Relegation to the Western League
20	Hamworthy United	0	0	0	0	0	0	0	0	Resigned to the Wessex League (Note: Hamworthy United resigned from the league on 6 October 2023 and their playing record of P7 W1 D2 L4 GF10 GA16 Pts5 was expunged.)

Source: Southern League website, Non League Matters
Rules for classification: 1) points; 2) goal difference; 3) number of goals scored; 4) number of matches won; 5) head-to-head results
(C) Champions; (O) Play-off winners; (P) Promoted; (R) Relegated

=== Results table ===
Home \ Away	BAS	BHH	BID	BIS	BMF	CRI	EVE	EXM	FRO	LAR	MAL	MEL	MOU	PAU	TAV	WES	WIL	WIM	YAT
Bashley	—	2–3	1–3	0–2	0–1	0–3	1–1	1–2	3–2	1–3	1–2	1–2	2–0	4–1	0–0	1–1	3–2	1–2	2–0
Bemerton Heath Harlequins	2–4	—	2–0	1–2	4–2	0–2	0–5	0–3	3–1	2–1	0–4	2–2	1–2	0–0	2–1	1–1	4–2	0–0	4–0
Bideford	1–3	1–1	—	4–1	1–1	1–2	0–2	2–1	0–1	2–1	3–1	3–1	1–1	0–0	2–3	0–3	0–2	3–1	1–1
Bishop's Cleeve	1–1	2–0	0–1	—	0–2	2–2	3–0	1–4	2–2	4–0	0–0	6–1	4–1	6–2	3–4	3–2	0–0	2–5	2–2
Bristol Manor Farm	0–0	4–0	2–3	1–1	—	3–1	2–0	3–2	1–2	2–2	3–1	3–0	3–4	0–3	2–3	2–0	3–0	1–2	1–1
Cribbs	2–2	1–0	2–0	0–4	1–0	—	0–0	1–0	1–0	1–1	2–1	1–0	1–2	1–0	2–2	1–0	1–1	2–1	2–1
Evesham United	2–0	2–1	1–2	1–0	1–2	1–1	—	2–4	2–3	0–0	0–2	5–3	1–2	0–0	3–1	0–0	3–2	0–0	1–1
Exmouth Town	0–1	0–4	0–1	1–1	2–3	2–3	1–1	—	0–0	5–0	1–3	2–1	2–2	1–2	0–1	1–1	3–1	1–4	1–2
Frome Town	2–1	3–0	4–0	1–0	3–3	0–0	3–2	2–1	—	2–0	4–0	2–2	1–0	1–0	3–1	3–1	3–0	2–2	2–0
Larkhall Athletic	2–0	1–2	4–3	1–3	1–3	5–1	1–1	5–0	1–1	—	2–0	1–0	1–0	4–0	3–0	1–0	2–1	3–1	2–2
Malvern Town	6–0	3–1	2–2	2–0	1–0	1–3	2–3	3–0	1–3	2–4	—	1–1	2–1	2–2	2–1	0–3	3–0	1–2	0–0
Melksham Town	0–0	4–0	2–1	1–0	2–2	2–3	1–1	2–0	1–2	1–5	2–2	—	3–2	5–0	0–1	0–2	0–0	1–3	0–3
Mousehole	2–2	3–1	5–0	7–3	2–0	2–2	1–3	4–1	3–2	1–1	3–0	3–4	—	3–0	3–2	4–0	4–0	1–3	0–1
Paulton Rovers	1–2	4–4	0–1	2–4	1–3	0–1	1–1	2–1	2–7	0–1	2–2	0–1	3–3	—	0–2	0–1	1–0	0–2	1–0
Tavistock	2–3	1–2	1–2	3–1	0–2	5–4	1–3	0–2	6–2	3–3	2–0	1–1	2–2	2–1	—	0–0	1–3	3–2	1–1
Westbury United	2–0	2–0	0–0	4–4	0–4	0–0	0–1	0–2	2–3	1–1	5–3	1–4	0–4	3–4	2–3	—	2–3	3–2	0–2
Willand Rovers	0–2	2–4	2–1	4–0	1–2	2–1	3–1	3–1	0–0	2–2	1–1	0–0	2–1	5–1	2–0	0–0	—	0–1	2–2
Wimborne Town	4–0	1–1	3–1	1–0	4–0	2–2	2–1	1–1	1–1	2–1	2–0	2–1	3–2	2–1	3–2	3–2	4–2	—	1–0
Yate Town	0–0	3–0	1–0	0–1	1–1	3–3	1–5	4–1	0–1	4–1	2–3	4–1	1–2	3–0	5–1	2–1	3–0	0–2	—

Source: Southern League
Legend: Blue = home team win; Yellow = draw; Red = away team win.

=== Play-offs ===
Semi-finals
2	Frome Town	3
5	Mousehole	0
3	Cribbs	1
4	Bristol Manor Farm	2

Final
2	Frome Town	3
4	Bristol Manor Farm	1

==== Semi-finals ====
1 May 2024	Frome Town	3–0	Mousehole	Frome
19:45 BST	Simpson 4'; Ollis 18', 45'	Report		Stadium: Badgers Hill; Attendance: 1,099; Referee: Robert Harrison

1 May 2024	Cribbs	1–2	Bristol Manor Farm	Cribbs Causeway
19:45 BST	Hodgson 61'	Report	Brain 3'; Lucas 69'	Stadium: The Lawns; Attendance: 837; Referee: Dale Wootton

==== Final ====
6 May	Frome Town	3–1	Bristol Manor Farm	Frome
15:00	Teale 20'; Simpson 67', 75'	Report	Bament 11'	Stadium: Badgers Hill; Attendance: 2,235; Referee: Adam Merchant

=== Stadia and locations ===
Locations of Division One South clubs

Club	Location	Stadium	Capacity
Bashley	Bashley	Bashley Road	4,250
Bemerton Heath Harlequins	Bemerton	Moon Park	2,100
Bideford	Bideford	The Sports Ground	2,000
Bishop's Cleeve	Bishop's Cleeve	Kayte Lane	1,500
Bristol Manor Farm	Bristol (Sea Mills)	The Creek	2,000
Cribbs	Cribbs Causeway	The Lawns	1,000
Evesham United	Evesham	Jubilee Stadium	3,000
Exmouth Town	Exmouth	Southern Road	n/a
Frome Town	Frome	Badgers Hill	2,000
Hamworthy United	Hamworthy	The Country Ground	2,000
Larkhall Athletic	Bath (Larkhall)	The Plain Ham Ground	1,000
Malvern Town	Malvern	Langland Stadium	2,500
Melksham Town	Melksham	Oakfield Stadium	2,500
Mousehole	Mousehole	Trungle Parc	n/a
Paulton Rovers	Paulton	Athletic Field	2,500
Tavistock	Tavistock	Langsford Park	2,000
Westbury United	Westbury	Meadow Lane	n/a
Willand Rovers	Willand	The Stan Robinson Stadium	1,000
Wimborne Town	Wimborne Minster	The Cuthbury	3,000
Yate Town	Yate	Lodge Road	2,000

== See also ==
- Southern Football League
- 2023–24 Isthmian League
- 2023–24 Northern Premier League
