= Wellow F.C. =

- Full name: Wellow Football Club
- Founded: c 1920 (reformed 1987)
- Ground: Hatches Farm Sports Ground
- Capacity: 1,000
- Chairman: Ralph Boden
- Manager: Tim Cater
- League: Southampton League
Home colours	Away colours

Wellow F.C. are a long-running amateur football club, based in Wellow - a village located on the edge of the New Forest, four miles north west of Romsey, in the Test Valley district of Hampshire.

They are an FA Charter Standard Club and are affiliated to the Hampshire Football Association, with twelve teams, starting at Under 7's through to adults.

== History ==
- Wellow F.C. have a long fragmented history that dates back over a century with several incarnations. The present day club was re-established in 1987.

=== Original club ===
It is believed that the original club was formed circa 1920 as West Wellow and played at the sports field on Lower Common Road - where Wellow & Plaitford Cricket Club still play. They initially played friendly fixtures before joining the Salisbury & District League. In 1927, they joined the newly formed Romsey Division of the Southampton League, remaining there until 1931 when it was merged in with the main Junior Divisions.

The club disbanded during World War II, and did not reform until 1951. Now known as Wellow, they returned to the Southampton League and enjoyed instant success, winning three successive Junior Division titles. Wellow then spent the sixties alternating between the Senior and Junior divisions until leaving the competition in 1974. The Sunday side continued playing until 1982.

=== Present day club ===
Following the opening of the new Hatches Farm Sports Ground, Wellow was relaunched in 1987 as a Sunday side and joined the New Forest League. After enjoying much success, they transferred to the larger and more challenging City of Southampton Sunday League, where they climbed up through the divisions.

Wellow switched to Saturday football in 1992 and returned to the Southampton League. Here they enjoyed great success, winning two Junior Division titles as they climbed up through the ranks.

After a spell of consolidation, the new millennium saw Wellow's fortunes again take off. Under the management of Wayne Lockey, they assembled a strong and experienced side, which won a series of promotions to reach the Premier Division. After finishing third in 2006, they carried out some impressive ground improvements and successfully applied to join the Wessex League Division 3. Here they finished third in their debut season, but after the local council rejected an application to install floodlights, the ambitious manager and players departed.

Wellow then joined the Hampshire League 2004 for the 2007/08 campaign, but with a weakened side they struggled and finished bottom. This saw the club return to the Southampton League, but their fortunes did not improve and suffered further relegations down to Junior Division 3.

However, despite this, the club maintains a youth section with teams across various age categories, and the facilities at Hatches Farm are currently being upgraded.

== Honours ==
- Southampton League
  - Senior Division 1 Champions 2003/04
  - Senior Division 2 Runners-up 2002/03
  - Junior Division 2 Champions 1953/54 and Runners-up 1995/96
  - Junior Division 3 Champions 1952/53
  - Junior Division 4 Champions 1951/52 and 1993/94
  - Junior Division 8 Champions 1992/93

== Ground ==
Wellow play at Hatches Farm Sports Ground, Romsey Road, West Wellow, Hampshire, SO51 6EB.

The venue has a large car park, pavilion, two full-sized football pitches - with the main one enclosed with a fixed barrier and dugouts.

The local council have sublet the pitches to a number of clubs, most notably to Cadnam United and Athletico Romsey - who both played there during their brief stints in the Hampshire Premier League.

== Local rivalries ==
Wellow have a number of local rivals within the Test Valley district. Meetings with Awbridge, Braishfield, Michelmersh & Timsbury, Mottisfont and especially Romsey Town always generate much interest and attract large crowds.
