= Botley Village F.C. =

Association football club in England

- Full name: Botley Village Football Club
- Founded: 1894 (reformed 1997)
- Ground: Botley Recreation Ground
- Chairman: Chris Williams
- Manager: Chris Ball
- League: Southampton League
- Website: botleyvillagefc.co.uk
Home colours	Away colours

Botley Village F.C. are a long running amateur football club based in Botley, an historic market village located 3 miles east of Southampton in Hampshire, England.

They are affiliated to the Hampshire Football Association with Charter Status, running five teams from Under 9's to adults.

== History ==
=== Original Club ===
Botley F.C. were founded in 1894 and spent their early days playing friendly fixtures before becoming founder members the Botley & District League in 1902.

After the Great War, they joined the Meon Valley League and then, after a brief spell in the Hampshire League, moved to the Southampton League in 1927, winning the Eastern Division title in 1935.

The post World War II era saw renewed interest as Botley began participating in national cup competitions and joined the Hampshire League where they were placed in Division 2, but after four difficult seasons they dropped out - returning to the more realistic Southampton League.

The sixties saw the club's fortunes improve when they won a series of promotions to reach the Premier Division. The 1967/68 campaign was their most successful after winning the title and Southampton Senior Cup, beating favourites Netley Sports 2-1 at The Dell, Southampton.

This was rewarded with a return to the Hampshire League, and their dramatic rise continued as they immediately won the Division 3 East title, followed by promotion again as Division 2 runners-up. On limited resources, they did extremely well to consolidate in a very tough top-flight which at the time consisted of a number of semi-professional clubs, before suffering the three successive relegation's down to Division 4. In 1976, Botley again reached the Southampton Senior Cup final, but this time lost 2-3 against BAT Sports.

In 1980 Botley were relegated back to the Southampton League where they regrouped, eventually regaining their Premier Division status, but after finishing bottom in 1992 they folded - just two years shy of their centenary.

=== Phoenix Club ===
Efforts were soon made to revive the club, and in 1994 they returned as a Sunday side called Botley Brewery. Three years later, they merged with local youth set-up Botley Barracudas to form Botley Village F.C.

The club in its current format dates back to 1997, an expanded reformation to ensure the long running continuity of Saturday football in the village.

The new team switched back to Saturday soccer, and joined the Southampton League, where they quickly won a series of promotions to reach the Premier Division by 2001. Here Botley became regular title contenders, finishing in the top four each season (three times as runners-up) and twice reaching the Senior League Cup final, before joining the Hampshire League 2004 in 2008. Despite finishing fourth in their debut season, their fortunes rapidly declined after a player exodus, which eventually resulted in relegation.

Since 2012 Botley Village have played in the Southampton League, and in 2023 they won the Junior Division 2 title.

== Honours ==
- Hampshire League
  - Division 3 East Champions 1968-69
  - Division 2 Runners-up 1969-70
- Southampton League
  - Premier Division Champions 1967-68, Runners-up 2002-03, 2003-04 and 2005-06
  - Senior Division 1 Runners-up 1965-66, Runners-up 1989-90
  - Senior Division 2 Runners-up 1999-00
  - Junior Division 1 Runners-up 1998-99
  - Junior Division 2 Champions 2022-23
  - Junior Division 4 Runners-up 2012-13 and 2017-18
  - Junior Division 6 Champions 1988-89 (3rd team)
  - Junior Eastern Division Champions 1934-35 and 1959-60
  - Senior League Cup Finalists 2003-04 and 2005-06
  - Veterans 'A' Division Runners-up 2003-04
  - Veterans League Cup finalists 2004-05
- Southampton Football Association
  - Senior Cup Winners 1967-68, Finalists 1975-76
  - Junior 'A' Cup Winners 1959-60 and 1997-98, Finalists 1998-99
- Hampshire Football Association
  - Veterans Cup Winners 2002-03, Finalists 2003-04
- Other
  - Meon Valley League Champions
  - Botley & District League Champions

== Playing records ==
=== League ===
Season	Division	Position	Significant events
1945–46	Hampshire League Division 2	7/12	as Botley
1946–47	Hampshire League Division 2	11/12	
1947–48	Hampshire League Division 2	10/12	
1948–49	Hampshire League Division 2	14/14	left competition
1949–68	Southampton League		Southampton Senior Cup Winners 1968
1968–69	Hampshire League Division 3 East	1/14	Promoted
1969–70	Hampshire League Division 2	2/16	Promoted
1970–71	Hampshire League Division 1	10/16	
1971–72	Hampshire League Division 1	11/16	
1972–73	Hampshire League Division 1	16/16	Relegated
1973–74	Hampshire League Division 2	16/16	Relegated
1974–75	Hampshire League Division 3	16/16	Relegated
1975–76	Hampshire League Division 4	6/16	Southampton Senior Cup finalists
1976–77	Hampshire League Division 4	7/14	
1977–78	Hampshire League Division 4	5/14	
1978–79	Hampshire League Division 4	7/13	
1979–80	Hampshire League Division 4	12/12	Relegated
1980–92	Southampton League		Folded in 1992
1997–2008	Southampton League		Re-formed in 1997 as Botley Village
2008–09	Hampshire League 2004	4/15	
2009–10	Hampshire League 2004	15/15	withdrew
2010–11	Hampshire League 2004	16/17	
2011–12	Hampshire League 2004	12/13	left competition
2012–24	Southampton League		

=== FA Cup ===
Season	Round	Opponents	Result
1948-49	Extra-Preliminary Round	H v Winchester City	L 1-3

=== FA Amateur Cup ===
Season	Round	Opponents	Result
1948-49	Extra-Preliminary Round	A v Thornycroft Athletic	L 1-2

== Ground ==
Botley Village F.C. play at the Recreation Ground, High Street, Botley, SO30 2ES.

The venue has two pitches with a large car park and a modern pavilion. During their hey-day, Botley had their own Supporters Club and regularly attracted large crowds.

== Local rivalries ==
Botley Village have a number of local rivals, most notably Hedge End Rangers and Hedge End Town.
