= Hampshire League 2004 =

- Founded: 2004
- Folded: 2013
- Country: England
- Feeder to: Hampshire Premier League
- Relegation to: Southampton League; Portsmouth League; Bournemouth League; Isle of Wight League; Aldershot League; Andover & District League, Basingstoke & District League; Winchester & District League
- Domestic cup: Hampshire Intermediate Cup; Local FA Divisional Senior Cups

The Hampshire League 2004 was an English football league comprising teams located in Hampshire. It was formed in 2004, ran for nine seasons and served as a feeder league to Step 7 of the National League System. It was an unofficial continuation of the original Hampshire League which had controversially been disbanded earlier the same year.

== History ==
The competition was originally formed in June 2004 following the expansion of the Wessex League, as not all the clubs from the recently disbanded Hampshire League were able to meet the stricter ground criteria and so re-formed a new successor competition. Other clubs from local leagues, plus the reserve teams of some of the newly elected Wessex League clubs, brought the founding complement up to 16 teams, although one failed to see through the inaugural season. Sporting BTC and Upham were the first league and cup winners, whilst externally Lyndhurst brought some extra credibility when they won the Southampton Senior Cup.

The following three seasons were dominated by Mottisfont, who won three successive titles (the first two unbeaten!) as well as winning the 2005–06 League Cup. That season they were also beaten finalists in the Southampton Senior Cup.

The 2007–08 season saw the formation of the Hampshire Premier League, which accommodated the clubs from the recently disbanded Wessex League Division 2. The Hampshire Football Association then placed the new competition at a higher level in its precedence list, thus making Hampshire League 2004 a feeder League. In May 2008 it was announced that the two county leagues were in talks about merging into a new two tier competition, which it was hoped would officially gain Step 7 status in the National League System. This merger ultimately did not occur, although the HPL was nonetheless awarded Step 7 feeder status.

Netley Central Sports won consecutive doubles in 2008–09 and 2009–10, but after this the league became a more even playing field with three different sides clinching the title. A decline in numbers saw the League operating with just ten teams in the 2012–13 season, of which only three founder members (Broughton, Durley and Michelmersh & Timsbury) remained. In June 2013 the competition was dissolved with its remaining member clubs being invited to join the newly created Division One of the Hampshire Premier League.

== Roll of Honour ==
Season	Champions	Cup Winners	Participants
2004–05	Sporting BTC	Upham	16
2005–06	Mottisfont	Mottisfont	17
2006–07	Mottisfont	Sporting BTC	16
2007–08	Mottisfont	Denmead & Purbrook	15
2008–09	Netley Central Sports	Netley Central Sports	15
2009–10	Netley Central Sports	Netley Central Sports	14
2010–11	Hedge End Rangers	US Portsmouth Reserves	17
2011–12	Durley	Upham	13
2012–13	Lyndhurst	Upham	10

== A to Z of clubs ==
Letter	Club
A	Academicals (Southampton University)
	Andover Lions (formerly Andover Reserves)
B	Botley Village
	Broughton
	BTC Southampton
C	Crusaders
D	Durley
E	East Lodge
F	Fair Oak
	Forest Town
	Four Marks
H	Hamble Club Reserves
	Hedge End Rangers
	Horndean United (formerly Denmead & Purbrook)
	Hythe & Dibden Reserves
I	Infinity
L	Ludgershall Sports
	Ludwig Leisure Basingstoke
	Lyndhurst
M	Michelmersh & Timsbury (formerly M&T Awbridge)
	Mottisfont
N	Netley Central Sports
Q	QK Southampton Reserves
S	Sporting BTC
	Stockbridge Reserves
T	Twyford
U	US Portsmouth Reserves
	Upham
V	Vernham Dean
W	Warsash Wasps
	Wellow
	Winchester Castle (formerly Winchester City 'A')
	AFC Wolversdene Irons (formerly Andover New Street 'A')
