= Brett Williams (footballer, born 1987) =

English footballer

Personal information
- Full name: Brett Anthony Williams
- Date of birth: 1 December 1987 (age 38)
- Place of birth: Southampton, England
- Position: Forward

Team information
- Current team: Hedge End Rangers

Youth career
- –2004: Hedge End Rangers
- 2004–2006: Eastleigh

Senior career*
Years	Team	Apps	(Gls)
2006–2008	Winchester City		
2008–2011	Eastleigh	45	(9)
2009	→ AFC Totton (loan)		
2011–2013	Reading	0	(0)
2011–2012	→ Rotherham United (loan)	11	(2)
2012	→ Northampton Town (loan)	18	(3)
2012–2013	→ Woking (loan)	26	(2)
2013–2015	Aldershot Town	89	(39)
2015–2016	Stevenage	15	(2)
2015–2016	→ Forest Green Rovers (loan)	5	(1)
2016	Forest Green Rovers	20	(4)
2016–2017	Torquay United	39	(11)
2017–2018	Bromley	26	(6)
2018–2019	Torquay United	31	(4)
2018–2019	→ Sutton United (loan)	22	(3)
2019–2020	Weymouth	26	(7)
2020–2022	AFC Totton	44	(13)
2022	→ Lymington Town (loan)	3	(1)
2022–2023	Gosport Borough	21	(6)
2023–2025	Bashley	55	(10)
2024	→ AFC Portchester (loan)	11	(3)
2025	AFC Stoneham	6	(0)
2026–	Hedge End Rangers	1	(0)
- * Club domestic league appearances and goals as of 08:51, 17 August 2026 (UTC)

Brett Anthony Williams (born 1 December 1987) is an English footballer who plays as a forward for Hedge End Rangers.

== Club career ==
Williams began his career at Eastleigh before joining Winchester City in 2008. However, in November 2008 Williams returned to Eastleigh on loan before signing a new contract in February 2009. In October 2009, Eastleigh received a club record transfer fee from AFC Totton where he then played for one season before returning to Eastleigh for a third time after a successful one-month-long loan.

Williams joined Championship team Reading on 18 January on an 18-month contract after a successful trial period which included scoring for the reserves. Reading paid £50,000 to sign Williams. Other clubs that were rumoured to be interested in signing Williams were Southampton, Brighton & Hove Albion and Wycombe Wanderers. Since then he has gone on to score again and provide an assist in a reserve match against Crystal Palace.

Despite never being named in a squad to face opposition, Williams has travelled with the first team squad including to Bramall Lane when they played Sheffield United and could be seen warming up on the field before kick off with teammate Simon Church. On 22 February 2011, Williams was named on the bench to face Millwall at the Madejski for the first time.

For the 2011–12 season, Williams joined firstly Rotherham United on loan until January, and then Northampton Town. He scored his first professional goal for Rotherham in the 2–1 loss to Crawley Town.

In July 2012, Williams joined St Johnstone on a week's trial with a view to a loan move, though ultimately the club did not follow up their interest. On 7 August he joined Conference National side Woking on a season long loan and scored his first goal for the club on 28 August in a 4–1 home defeat to Braintree Town. He had to wait nearly three months for his second goal, scoring in a 2–1 home defeat to Alfreton Town on 17 November. Williams returned to Reading at the end of the season having scored four goals in 31 appearances in all competitions.

He was released by Reading on 24 May 2013 having never made a first team appearance in his two-and-a-half years with the club. On 8 August, two days before the start of the 2013–14 Conference Premier season, Williams joined Aldershot Town having trialled with the team during pre-season.

Williams was the third highest goalscorer in the Conference Premier in the 2013–14 season with 24 goals, and he remained with Aldershot for the 2014–15 season.

On 12 June 2015, Williams joined League Two side Stevenage. In November 2015, he dropped back down into the National League, signing for Forest Green Rovers on a one-month loan. He made his debut as a substitute in a 2–0 home win over Altrincham on 28 November 2015. He returned to Stevenage at the end of his loan spell, but on 15 January 2016 re-joined Forest Green permanently after Stevenage had agreed to mutually terminate his contract.

He went on to appear in the 2015–16 National League play-offs for Forest Green and scored the winning goal in a play-off semi-final first leg away win at Dover Athletic. He started the play-off final on 15 May 2016 against Grimsby Town at Wembley Stadium but ended up on the losing side. The next day on 16 May 2016 it was confirmed that he had been released.

On 4 June 2016 Williams joined National League side Torquay United after agreeing terms with the club. After a season in which Williams' goals proved vital in saving United from relegation, he left the club and joined National League rivals Bromley. After spending half of the 2017–18 season at Bromley, Williams re-signed for Torquay United on 26 January 2018.

In June 2019, Williams joined Weymouth. In May 2020, he joined Southern Football League Division One South side AFC Totton and subsequently joined divisional rivals Lymington Town on a one-month loan deal in January 2022.

In May 2022, Williams was forced to play as an emergency goalkeeper for AFC Totton due to injuries in the squad. He kept a clean sheet in a 3–0 win over Folland Sports to win the Southampton Senior Cup at St Mary's Stadium in his 100th appearance for the club.

In November 2022, Williams joined Gosport Borough. In June 2023, Williams joined Bashley ahead of the new season. In March 2024, he spent time at Wessex League side AFC Portchester.

In July 2025, Williams joined Wessex League Premier Division side AFC Stoneham.

In July 2026, Williams joined Wessex League One Division side Hedge End Rangers. He made his debut on 15th August 2026 coming on as a second half substitute in a 3-1 win against Lymington Town.

== Personal life ==
Williams has one brother. He is from Hedge End and attended Wildern School and Eastleigh College.

Before joining Reading, Williams was a part-time taxi driver for Airlynx Express who sponsor Eastleigh.

== Career statistics ==
As of match played 27 August 2018.

Appearances and goals by club, season and competition
Club	Season	League			FA Cup		League Cup		Other		Total	
Club	Season	Division	Apps	Goals	Apps	Goals	Apps	Goals	Apps	Goals	Apps	Goals
Eastleigh	2008–09	Conference South	22	2	0	0	—		0	0	22	2
Eastleigh	2009–10	Conference South	6	0	0	0	—		0	0	6	0
Eastleigh	2010–11	Conference South	17	7	3	1	—		2 (Note: Appearance(s) in FA Trophy)	0	22	8
Eastleigh	Total		45	9	3	1	—		2	0	50	10
Reading	2010–11	Championship	0	0	0	0	0	0	—		0	0
Rotherham United (loan)	2011–12	League Two	11	2	2	0	0	0	0	0	13	2
Northampton Town (loan)	2011–12	League Two	18	3	0	0	0	0	0	0	18	3
Woking (loan)	2012–13	Conference Premier	26	2	1	0	—		2	1	29	3
Aldershot Town	2013–14	Conference Premier	43	24	2	1	—		5	3	50	28
Aldershot Town	2014–15	Conference Premier	46	15	5	0	—		1	0	52	15
Aldershot Town	Total		89	39	7	1	—		6	3	102	43
Stevenage	2015–16	League Two	15	2	0	0	1	0	1 (Note: Appearance(s) in Football League Trophy)	0	17	2
Forest Green Rovers (loan)	2015–16	National League	5	1	1	0	—		1	0	7	1
Forest Green Rovers	2015–16	National League	20	4	0	0	—		3 (Note: Appearance(s) in National League Play-offs)	1	25	4
Torquay United	2016–17	National League	39	11	2	0	—		0	0	41	11
Bromley	2017–18	National League	26	6	2	0	—		2	0	30	6
Torquay United	2017–18	National League	16	4	—		—		—		16	4
Torquay United	2018–19	National League South	7	0	0	0	—		0	0	7	0
Torquay United	Total		23	4	0	0	—		0	0	23	4
Career total			306	80	18	2	1	0	17	5	354	89
