= Jamie White (footballer) =

English footballer

Personal information
- Date of birth: 17 November 1989 (age 36)
- Place of birth: Southampton, England
- Position: Striker

Team information
- Current team: Hedge End Rangers

Youth career
- 2005–2008: Southampton

Senior career*
Years	Team	Apps	(Gls)
2008–2010	Southampton	3	(0)
2008–2009	→ Shrewsbury Town (loan)	9	(1)
2009	→ Eastleigh (loan)	13	(1)
2010	Eastleigh	2	(0)
2011	Totton & Eling	3	(2)
2011	Whitsunday Miners	36	(9)
2011–2012	Winchester City	32	(51)
2012–2014	Salisbury City	69	(36)
2014	Bristol Rovers	11	(0)
2014–2015	Sutton United	14	(2)
2015	→ Farnborough (loan)	6	(2)
2015–2016	Gosport Borough	6	(0)
2015	→ Poole Town (loan)	4	(2)
2015	→ Farnborough (loan)	7	(2)
2016	Salisbury	14	(11)
2016–2017	Blackfield & Langley	52	(42)
2017	Moneyfields	3	(2)
2018–2022	Infinity	84	(84)
2022	Folland Sports	11	(9)
2022–2023	Infinity	11	(8)
2023–2026	Millbrook	74	(61)
2026–	Hedge End Rangers	7	(7)
- * Club domestic league appearances and goals as of 08:33, 30 March 2026 (UTC)

Jamie White (born 17 November 1989) is an English footballer who plays as a striker for Hedge End Rangers. He began his career with Southampton, making his professional debut in the Championship before spending the majority of his career in non-League football.

== Playing career ==
Born in Southampton, White attended Woodlands Community College, having joined the Southampton Academy as an eight-year-old. He began to play regularly for the club's youth setup in 2005 after a brief spell at Chelsea.

White featured in the FA Youth Cup semi-final in 2005–06, as well as the Academy League play-offs where he scored the opener after coming off the bench against Blackburn Rovers in the semi-final to set Saints on their way to the Championship.

He was the winner of the 2006–07 Academy Player of the Year award, but had to accept his prize on crutches, after suffering a cruciate injury whilst training with the first team in March 2007. Despite his injury, White was still able to claim that season's top scorer prize for the Under 18s side and made a full recovery in 2007–08.

Following a strong pre-season, White was named on the bench for the League Cup tie against Exeter City, and went on to make his first team debut against Derby County on 23 August 2008.

On 14 November 2008, he joined Shrewsbury Town on loan for a month, later extended for a second month. It was while at Shrewsbury, White scored his first senior goal in the 2–1 home win against Dagenham & Redbridge.

Unfortunately, after returning from his loan spell, White broke his leg and dislocated his ankle as the result of a mistimed tackle in a reserve game against Aldershot Town.

White joined non-league side Eastleigh on 9 October 2009 on a month-long loan deal from Southampton. He was released by Southampton on 15 May 2010 and signed for Eastleigh on 21 December 2010 on a non-contract basis.

In January 2011, he signed a short-term contract with local club Totton & Eling.

Later on in 2011, White signed for Queensland State League side Whitsunday Miners. He played 36 matches and scored 9 goals.

For the 2011–2012 season he signed with Wessex Premier side Winchester City, he ended up one goal short of equalling the record number of goals in the Wessex League in a season as Winchester won the division.

=== Salisbury City ===
Following his successful season with Winchester City where he netted 51 goals in 32 league appearances, he moved to Salisbury City, who at the time were playing 3 leagues above Winchester City. Salisbury had been trying to sign White for about 5 or 6 months before they eventually got hold of him. The big difference between leagues didn't seem to prevent White from playing at his best as he featured in almost all of Salisbury's league matches, and scored 26 goals for them in the league. This included a spectacular volley in Salisbury's play-off final victory against Dover Athletic from just outside the box. He jointly won the golden boot for that season. White later signed a 2-year contract with Salisbury, keeping him with the club until the end of the 2014–15 season. In the pre-season period before the 2013–14 campaign, White only appeared in one of the fixtures as he required an operation on a hernia. This meant that he would be out for about 6 weeks and would miss the start of the new season. It took longer than expected to get back to match fitness for White, but he eventually made a couple of appearances as a substitute. Unfortunately, White became injured again and so had to take further time out. Despite an injury plagued season, White still managed to score 11 goals in the 2013–14 campaign, including 5 goals in the last 5 games of the season.

=== Bristol Rovers ===
On 6 June 2014, White signed for recently relegated Conference Premier side Bristol Rovers after becoming a free agent the evening before. However, just five months later, White had his contract terminated by mutual consent in order to join Conference South side Sutton United. During his time with Rovers, White made just 11 league appearances and failed to score once.

=== Sutton United ===
White scored within 14 minutes of his Sutton debut, putting his side 1–0 up away to local rivals Bromley. However, United eventually lost the match 2–1. On 26 March, he joined fellow Conference South side Farnborough on loan. He made his debut two days later, playing the whole match in a 2–2 draw against Bishop Stortford.

=== Gosport Borough ===
Following his release from Sutton United, White joined National League South side Gosport Borough ahead of the 2015–16 season. In mid-October he was signed on a loan to Poole Town, which was followed by a loan spell to Farnborough that expired during Boxing Week. He made one more appearance for Gosport Borough, scoring a goal in the Russell Cotes Cup win against Sholing on 13 January 2016, before joining Salisbury in the Wessex League Premier Division on an initial three-month deal. Despite helping them gain promotion to Southern League, he stays in Wessex League for the 2016–17 season, joining Blackfield & Langley in June 2016. He bagged 42 goals in 52 league games.

On 25 November 2017 he made his debut for Moneyfields, scoring in a 1–1 draw at Cambridge City.

Having played for Hampshire Premier League side Infinity for the end of the 2017–18 season, White confirmed on 17 May 2018 that he had rejoined the side for the 2018–19 season.

On 5 February 2022, White joined Wessex League Division One side Folland Sports. Later that day, he scored on his debut in a 2–1 win over Andover Town.

The following season, White returned to Infinity who had restarted life in Hampshire Premier League Division One. The following season he began playing in the Wessex League once more, joining Millbrook.

In January 2026, White started playing for Hampshire Premier League side Hedge End Rangers.

== Career statistics ==
As of match played 15 November 2014

Appearances and goals by club, season and competition
Club	Season	League		FA Cup		FA Trophy		Play-offs		Total	
Club	Season	Apps	Goals	Apps	Goals	Apps	Goals	Apps	Goals	Apps	Goals
Salisbury City	2012–13	41	25	0	0	1	0	3	2	45	27
Salisbury City	2013–14	28	11	2	0	1	0	0	0	31	11
Salisbury City	Total	69	36	2	0	2	0	3	2	76	38
Bristol Rovers	2014–15	11	0	1	0	0	0	0	0	12	0
Bristol Rovers	Total	11	0	1	0	0	0	0	0	12	0
Career total		80	36	3	0	2	0	3	2	88	38
