= Timsbury =

Timsbury may refer to:

- Timsbury, Hampshire, England
- Timsbury, Somerset, England
