= Bishopstoke F.C. =

- Full name: Bishopstoke Football Club
- Nickname: The Hollies
- Founded: 1905 (reformed 2021)
- Ground: Hoe Lane, Bishops Waltham
- Chairman: Michael Hurley
- Manager: Geoff Harrison
- League: Southampton League
Home colours	Away colours

Bishopstoke F.C. are a long running amateur football club based in Bishopstoke, a large village located near Eastleigh in Hampshire, England.

The club are affiliated to the Hampshire Football Association and run adult Saturday and Sunday teams in the Southampton Leagues.

== History ==
- Bishopstoke F.C. have a long fragmented history that dates back over a century with several incarnations. The present day club was re-established in 2021.

=== Original club ===
Football has been played in the village since the early Twentieth century, and it is believed that the original Bishopstoke F.C. were founded circa 1905. Like most other teams at the time, initially played friendly fixtures.

After the Great War, Bishoptoke joined the Eastleigh & District League, where they played for many years with great success. They belatedly switched to the larger Southampton League in 1970, where they quickly climbed up through the Junior divisions, winning back-to-back titles to reach Senior Division 1 within five years. Here they again challenged for promotion, but after being hit by an exodus they dropped out in 1978.

The football team always had a strong association with the local Working Men's Club, and when it was resurrected by supporters two years later, the name was amended to Bishopstoke Social to reflect this. They returned to the Southampton League in 1980, and within five years had regained their Senior status - winning the Junior Division 1 title and two county cups along the way. Bishopstoke continued to make good progress with the addition of other teams and making a series of improvements at their Chickenhall Lane ground. Two further promotions saw them reach the Premier Division for the first time in 1991 and two years later they just missed out on the title by a point to neighbours Fair Oak.

However, they were soon compensated with election to the Hampshire League. Here the club continued to prosper, in their debut season they finished runners-up in Division 3. The momentum continued in Division 2, and after finishing fifth, a third-place finish in 1996 was rewarded with promotion to Division 1. On limited resources, Bishopstoke did well to consolidate their new found status for three seasons.

The new millennium saw a rapid decline in fortunes for the club with two successive relegations and the loss of their ground. The forced relocation to Fryern Hill in Chandlers Ford, did little to help matters and they left the competition in 2002 after twice finishing rock bottom.

==== Hampshire League record 1993-2002 ====
Season	Division	Position	Pld	W	D	L	F	A	Pts	Notes
1993/94	Three	2/16	30	20	5	5	112	44	65	Promoted
1994/95	Two	5/17	32	16	8	8	72	47	56	
1995/96	Two	3/18	34	21	5	8	92	51	68	Promoted
1996/97	One	15/21	40	13	6	21	56	82	45	
1997/98	One	15/20	38	12	6	20	66	102	42	
1998/99	One	18/19	36	8	5	23	37	106	29	Premier Division formed, relegated
1999/00	One	17/19	34	8	7	19	46	80	31	Relegated
2000/01	Two	16/16	30	3	5	22	25	81	14	
2001/02	Two	16/16	30	0	3	27	22	151	3	Left competition

The club then became known as Bishopstoke WMC and returned to the Southampton League, where in order to rebuild, they voluntarily dropped down to Junior Division 1. After a spell playing at Bishopstoke Rec, a new home ground was found at the better equipped Lapstone Park in Fair Oak. In 2008 they regained their Premier Division status, and remained there until a poor start prompted their withdrawal early in 2015/16 campaign.

=== Phoenix club ===
After a spell of inactivity, the club was revived for a third time, initially as a Sunday side. In 2025 they relocated again to Hoe Lane at nearby Bishops Waltham, reverted to being simply known as Bishopstoke and returned to the Southampton League.

== Honours ==
- Hampshire Football Association
  - Junior 'A' Cup Winners 1984/85
  - Junior 'B' Cup Winners 1980/81
  - Veterans Cup Finalists 2005/06
- Southampton Football Association
  - Junior 'A' Cup Finalists 1970/71 and 1984/85
  - Junior 'B' Cup Finalists 1980/81
  - Veterans Cup Winners 2003/04, Finalists 2002/03
- Hampshire League
  - Division 3 Runners-up 1993/94
- Southampton League
  - Premier Division Runners-up 1991/92
  - Senior Division 1 Champions 1990/91 and 1993/94 (Reserves)
  - Senior Division 2 Champions 1974/75, Runners-up 1988/89 and 1991/92 (Reserves)
  - Junior Division 1 Champions 1973/74 and 1984/85
  - Junior Division 9 Champions 1993/94 ('B' team)
  - Supplementary Cup Finalists 2014/15
  - Veterans 'B' Division Champions 2000/01
  - Veterans League Cup Winners 2003/04, Finalists 2000/01 and 2005/06
- Eastleigh & District League
  - Division 1 Champions
  - Division 2 Champions

== Ground ==
Bishopstoke F.C. currently play at Priory Park, Elizabeth Way, Bishops Waltham, Hampshire, SO31 1SQ.

The venue is owned by Bishops Waltham Parish Council and has a large car park and clubhouse with two adult football pitches and a cricket pitch. The ground is also used by Hampshire Premier League side Bishops Waltham Dynamoes.

== Local rivalries ==
Following the demise of close neighbours Fair Oak and West End, Bishopstoke now regard AFC Wyvern and Bishops Waltham Dynamoes their main local rivals.
