= Hedge End Rangers F.C. =

Hedge End Rangers
- Full name: Hedge End Rangers Football Club
- Founded: 1910 (reformed 2005)
- Ground: The Mortgage Decisions Stadium, Sholing
- Capacity: 2,500
- Chairman: Tim Lush
- Manager: Ryan Manship
- League: Wessex League Division One
- 2025–26: Hampshire Premier League Senior Division, 1st of 16 (promoted)
- Website: https://www.hedgeendrangers.co.uk/
Home colours	Away colours

Hedge End Rangers Football Club are an amateur football club based in Hedge End, a town and civil parish near Southampton in Hampshire, England.

They are affiliated to the Hampshire Football Association and as an FA Charter Standard Community football club run 46 teams comprising mini soccer, youth soccer, senior and girls. In addition Hedge End Rangers are a community club serving the community with separate boys and girls' soccer schools, a goalkeeping school, walking football and ladies social football. The Men's First Team are members of the Wessex League Division One. The Ladies team compete in the Southampton Play On League.

== History ==
- The club in its current format dates back to 2005, an expanded reformation to ensure the long running continuity of Saturday football in the town.

=== Original club ===
Hedge End F.C. was formed circa 1910 and initially played in the Meon Valley League before spending many years as members of the Southampton League. They were originally based at Greta Park in the town centre and after gradually climbing up the ranks, in 1966 they won the Senior Division 1 title. Apart from the 1984/85 season, they spent the next 25 years playing in the Premier Division.

After moving to the newly opened Norman Rodaway Centre they won their second top-flight title and promotion to the Hampshire League in 1991, where they were placed in the newly reformed Division 3, which they won in 1993. The following year they finished third in Division 2 (their highest final position) and won the Hampshire Intermediate Cup.

Hedge End remained at this level until relegation in 1997. After winning promotion in 2003, the club were hit by a player exodus and withdrew from the competition early the following season.

=== Phoenix club ===
Efforts were soon made to reform, and after linking up with Hedge End Rangers (a junior club, founded in 1974), they returned in 2005 as their senior section, amending their name to show the connection.

The new look Hedge End re-entered the Southampton League and climbed back up the ranks. In 2008 they joined the Hampshire League 2004 and finished runners-up in their debut season. After winning the title in 2011, the club made sufficient ground improvements to join the Hampshire Premier League where they initially did well. By this stage, Hedge End expanded with the addition of a successful veterans side which included a number of experienced players from the original club.

In 2014 Hedge End reached the Southampton Senior Cup final for the first time, but were well beaten 0-5 by Sholing at St Mary's Stadium.

However, after this their fortunes gradually declined. In 2018 they finished at the bottom of the table and were relegated to Division 1, where after another difficult season they withdrew from the competition.

After taking time out to rebuild, Hedge End Rangers returned to the Southampton Football League in 2020 and the following year relocated to the newly opened Deer Park School. In 2023 they finished as runners-up in the Premier Division and won the Senior League Cup after a 4-0 win over Braishfield at AFC Totton.

This saw the club return to Hampshire Premier League for what was their third spell of county football. Here, they won promotion from Division 1 as runners-up and then finished a creditable fifth place in the Senior Division.

In 2025 Hedge End Rangers agreed a groundshare with Sholing to use the Mortgage Decisions Stadium for all their men's first team home fixtures. The move saw the club earn promotion to the Wessex League Division One after finishing as runners-up in the Hampshire Premier League Senior Division.

== Honours ==
=== 1st Team ===
- Hampshire League
  - Division 3 Champions: 1992–93
- Hampshire Premier League
  - Senior Division Runners-up 2025-26
  - Division 1 Runners-up: 2023–24
- Hampshire League 2004
  - Champions: 2010–11; Runners-up: 2008–09
- Hampshire Football Association
  - Intermediate Cup Winners: 1993–94
  - Junior 'A' Cup Winners: 1958–59
- Southampton Football Association
  - Senior Cup Finalists: 2013–14
- Southampton League
  - Senior League Cup Winners: 2022–23
  - Premier Division Champions: 1972–73 and 1990–91; Runners-up: 1973–74 and 2022–23
  - Senior Division 1 Champions: 1965–66; Runners-up: 1984–85
  - Junior Division 1 Runners-up: 2005–06
  - Junior Eastern Division Champions: 1956–57
- Meon Valley League
  - Champions: 1919–20
- FA Vase
  - First Round 2026-27

=== 2nd Team ===
- Hampshire Premier League
  - Combination Cup Winners: 2014–15
- Hampshire Combination Development League
  - League Cup finalists 2025-26
- Southampton League
  - Junior Division 7 Runners-up: 1966-67

=== Veterans ===
- Southampton League
  - Veterans 'B' Division Champions: 2017–18, Runners-up 2009-10, 2012–13 and 2023–24
  - Veterans 'D' Division Champions: 2008–09
  - Veterans Supplementary Cup Winners: 2010–11

== Home ground ==
In 2025 Hedge End Rangers agreed a groundshare with Sholing F.C. to use the Mortgage Decisions Stadium for all their men's first team home fixtures. The move has enabled them to progress to the Wessex League.

The development and youth teams continue to use the facilities at Deer Park School, Sika Avenue, Botley, Southampton, SO30 2HT.

This new facility has large parking with a number of pitches. The main pitch boasts an all-weather 4G surface with one with fixed barrier, fifty seater stand and floodlights. The record attendance was in July 2025 when a crowd of 430 were present for a charity fundraiser against an Ex-Southampton XI.

The club's former homes at Greta Park and the Norman Rodaway Centre both remain in use, the latter of which is now used by local rivals Hedge End Town.

== Local rivalries ==
Botley Village and Hedge End Town are regarded as the main local rivals.

== Notable players ==
In the Seventies, Hedge End were managed by the former Southampton and Colchester United striker Augie Scott.

More recently, both Andrew Surman and Brett Williams played for Hedge End Rangers Youth before turning professional.

In January 2026 Hedge End Rangers signed Jamie White who scored two goals on his debut against Moneyfields Reserves on Wednesday 28 January.

In July 2026 Hedge End Rangers signed Brett Williams who made his debut on 15th August 2026 in a 3-1 win over Lymington Town in Wessex League One.

== Playing Records ==
=== League career ===
Season	Division	Position	Significant events
1955-91	Southampton League		Premier Division champions 1991
1991/92	Hampshire League Division 3	7/14	
1992/93	Hampshire League Division 3	1/16	Promoted
1993/94	Hampshire League Division 2	3/17	
1994/95	Hampshire League Division 2	10/17	
1995/96	Hampshire League Division 2	14/18	
1996/97	Hampshire League Division 2	18/18	Relegated
1997/98	Hampshire League Division 3	9/16	
1998/99	Hampshire League Division 3	5/18	Re-organisation
1999/00	Hampshire League Division 2	5/14	
2000/01	Hampshire League Division 2	15/16	
2001/02	Hampshire League Division 2	11/16	
2002/03	Hampshire League Division 2	3/13	Promoted
2003/04	Hampshire League Division 1	16/16	Left competition
2005-08	Southampton League		
2008/09	Hampshire League 2004	2/15	
2009/10	Hampshire League 2004	4/14	
2010/11	Hampshire League 2004	1/17	Promoted
2011/12	Hampshire Premier League	7/18	
2012/13	Hampshire Premier League	4/17	Competition absorbed Hampshire League 2004
2013/14	Hampshire Premier League Senior Division	13/18	
2014/15	Hampshire Premier League Senior Division	13/18	
2015/16	Hampshire Premier League Senior Division	16/18	
2016/17	Hampshire Premier League Senior Division	13/16	
2017/18	Hampshire Premier League Senior Division	16/16	Relegated
2018/19	Hampshire Premier League Division 1	6/8	Left competition
2020-23	Southampton League		
2023/24	Hampshire Premier League Division 1	2/13	Promoted
2024/25	Hampshire Premier League Senior Division	5/16	
2025/26	Hampshire Premier League Senior Division	2/16	Promoted
2026/27	Wessex League Division 1		
