= Durley F.C. =

Association football club in England

- Full name: Durley Football Club
- Founded: 1909
- Ground: Durley Recreation Ground
- Chairman: Colin Watts
- Manager: Paul Darbyshire
- League: Southampton League
Home colours	Away colours

Durley F.C. are a long running amateur football club based in Durley, a village and civil parish located between Southampton and Winchester in Hampshire, England.

The club are affiliated to the Hampshire Football Association and are long standing members of the Southampton League.

== History ==
Durley were founded circa 1909 and initially played friendly fixtures before the outbreak of World War I forced them to disband. In 1919 they reformed and enrolled in the Meon Valley League, which they won four times during the thirties.

After World War II, the club joined the Eastleigh & District League, before moving on to the Southampton League. Here they climbed the Junior divisions, reaching the Senior section in 1963 only to be relegated straight back again. After a spell in the doldrums, the club bounced back in 1974 when they won the Junior Division 4 title.

The late eighties saw an upturn in fortunes as Durley won four promotions in seven seasons to reach the Premier Division for the first time in 1993. They were then relegated straight back, but returned a year later and solidified their status in the top-flight.

In 2003, Durley made a successful application to join the Hampshire League and finished 10th in Division 2. However, the competition was then absorbed by the expanding Wessex League, and unable to meet the stricter ground criteria, Durley instead became founder members of the Hampshire League 2004.

Durley became regular title contenders and after several near misses, they finally won the title in 2012. A year later, the competition became Division 1 of the Hampshire Premier League, but by this point the team had broken up and after finishing bottom, they were relegated.

Durley celebrated their centenary in 2019 and continue to operate in the Southampton League, forming a Veterans side in 2022.

== Honours ==
=== 1st Team ===
- Hampshire League 2004
  - Champions: 2011–12
  - Runners-up: 2010–11
- Southampton League
  - Senior Division 1 Runners-up 1992–93 and 1994–95
  - Junior Division 1 Champions 1962-63, Runners-up 1965–66
  - Junior Division 2 Champions 1986–87
  - Junior Division 4 Champions 1973–74
  - Junior Eastern Division Champions 1959–60
- Meon Valley League
  - Champions 1933-34, 1936-37 and 1937-38. Runners-up 1938-39
  - League Cup winners 1937-38 and 1948-49

=== 2nd Team ===
- Southampton League
  - Junior Division 3 Champions 2017-18
  - Junior League Vase Winners 2017-18

== County League record 2003–14 ==
Season	Division	Position	Significant events
2003–04	Hampshire League Division 2	10/15	Competition absorbed by the Wessex League
2004–05	Hampshire League 2004	3/16	
2005–06	Hampshire League 2004	3/17	
2006–07	Hampshire League 2004	9/16	
2007–08	Hampshire League 2004	4/15	
2008–09	Hampshire League 2004	11/15	
2009–10	Hampshire League 2004	5/14	Southampton Senior Cup semi-finalists
2010–11	Hampshire League 2004	2/17	
2011–12	Hampshire League 2004	1/13	
2012–13	Hampshire League 2004	9/10	Competition absorbed by the Hampshire Premier League
2013–14	Hampshire Premier League Division 1	10/11	

== Ground ==
Durley F.C. play at the Recreation Ground, Kytes Lane, Durley, SO32 2AE.

The venue is enclosed with a large car park and a modern pavilion.

== Local rivalries ==
Durley have a number of local rivals including Bishops Waltham Dynamoes and Upham.
