= Swanmore F.C. =

English football club

- Full name: Swanmore Football Club
- Nickname: Swans
- Founded: 1906
- Dissolved: 1999
- Ground: Broad Lane Recreation Ground, Swanmore.
Home colours	Away colours

Swanmore F.C. was a long running amateur football club based in Swanmore, a village near Bishop's Waltham in the Meon Valley area of Hampshire, England.

== History ==
Swanmore were originally established in 1906 and initially played friendly matches.

In 1920 they became founder members of the Meon Valley League, where they held membership for many years - winning the title on multiple occasions. In 1949 Swanmore won the Hampshire Junior 'A' Cup.

After spells playing in the Eastleigh and Winchester Leagues, Swanmore belatedly joined the Southampton League in 1971. Success was instant, as they enjoyed a meteoric rise - winning six promotions (including four titles) to reach the Premier Division by 1978.

'The Swans' consolidated their new found status in the top-flight and were a steady mid-table side until relegation in 1986. After a spell of rebuilding, they bounced back stronger three years later.

In 1992 Swanmore finished second, and made a successful application to join the Hampshire League Division 3. Initially, the club performed well at the higher grade - finishing as high as fourth in 1995.

After two difficult seasons, the 1998/99 campaign saw a vast improvement with a solid top half final position. However, like many others, their prospects of further progression were massively reduced following the introduction of stricter ground grading requirements. Inevitably, this saw the ambitious management team depart for pastures new - unable to find a suitable replacement, and compounded by the all too familiar problems of high costs and shortage of volunteers, Swanmore folded.

== Honours ==
=== 1st Team ===
- Hampshire Football Association
  - Junior 'A' Cup Winners 1948/49
- Southampton League
  - Premier Division Runners-up 1991/92
  - Senior Division 1 Champions 1977/78, Runners-up 1988/89
  - Senior Division 2 Runners-up 1976/77
  - Junior Division 1 Champions 1975/76
  - Junior Division 2 Runners-up 1973/74
  - Junior Division 3 Champions 1972/73
  - Junior Division 5 Champions 1971/72
- Meon Valley League
  - Division 1 Champions
  - Pink Cup Winners

=== 2nd Team ===
- Southampton League
  - Junior Division 3 Champions 1992/93
  - Junior Division 4 Champions 1991/92, Runners-up 1979/80
  - Junior Division 5 Champions 1978/79
  - Junior Division 7 Champions 1977/78

== Hampshire League record 1992-99 ==
Season	Division	Position	Pld	W	D	L	F	A	Pts	Notes
1992/93	Three	9/16	30	11	7	12	59	52	40	
1993/94	Three	8/16	30	12	6	12	60	51	42	
1994/95	Three	4/18	34	19	5	10	68	59	62	Highest ever position
1995/96	Three	7/18	34	15	9	10	53	57	54	
1996/97	Three	16/20	38	11	6	21	47	95	39	
1997/98	Three	15/16	30	4	1	25	35	119	13	Re-elected
1998/99	Three	8/19	34	14	7	13	77	62	49	Folded

== Ground ==
Swanmore F.C. played at Broad Lane Recreation Ground, Swanmore, Hampshire, SO32 2PD. Owned by Swanmore Parish Council, the venue has an adult football pitch and a multi-purpose pavilion.

It very much remains in use today, and with local youth sides Waltham Wolves and AFC Swanmore using the facilities. The ground is also home to Swanmore Cricket Club.

== Notable players ==
Swanmore had many fine players during their long history. Hampshire cricketer Adrian Aymes played during the mid-eighties, whilst former Southampton player Cliff Huxford was co-manager during their final campaign.

== Local rivalries ==
Swanmore enjoyed a healthy local rivalry with a number of clubs from within the Meon Valley area. Neighbours Bishops Waltham Town were regarded at their main rivals.
