= Awbridge F.C. =

Association football club in England

- Full name: Awbridge Football Club
- Nickname: The 'Bridge
- Founded: 1904
- Dissolved: 2006
- Ground: Village Hall Field
| Home colours | Away colours |

Awbridge F.C. was a long running amateur football club based in Awbridge (pronounced 'A-bridge', with the letter 'w' silent), a village and civil parish about three miles northwest of Romsey in the Test Valley district of Hampshire, England,

They were longstanding members of the Hampshire League and were eventually absorbed by neighbours Michelmersh & Timsbury after a brief spell groundsharing.

== History ==
The club were originally known as Awbridge Albion and spent their early days playing friendly fixtures. Their first known game was in November 1904 when they defeated Landford 4–0.

After the Great War, the club became more organised and began using the Village Hall Field for their home games. In 1923, Awbridge were amongst the founder members of the short-lived Ampfield & District League, before joining the Salisbury & District League two years later, where they won numerous trophies. The Thirties saw them switch to the Southampton League where they enjoyed further success.

After World War II, the club reformed as Awbridge and in 1948 returned to the Southampton League where they were placed in Junior Division 4. Significant progress was made; by 1953 they had risen to the Senior section, formed a reserves side and even had their own Supporters Club.

The Sixties were very much a successful period in which they dominated the local football scene. Under the astute management of Wilf Moody, they twice won the Premier Division and Southampton Senior Cup (both finals played at The Dell, Southampton) along with a solitary Hampshire Intermediate Cup triumph (played at Dean Court, Bournemouth). These successes were eventually rewarded with election into the Hampshire League in 1968, where they promptly won the Division 3 West title at the first attempt.

On limited resources, Awbridge spent three seasons rubbing shoulders with some big-guns in Division 2 before two relegations within three seasons saw them drop to Division 4, where they continued to struggle. Until this point, the club had used the original Village Hall building, but after receiving an ultimatum to improve their facilities, they embarked on an ambitious campaign to build their own separate pavilion, which was officially opened in 1980.

This saw Awbridge re-emerge as a force. They regained their Division 2 status, enjoyed numerous cup runs and were rather unfortunate not to win any major silverware. In 1986 they were placed in a new-look Division 1 following the formation of the Wessex League and did well to consolidate at this highly competitive level until relegation in 1993. Two years later, the club were back in Division 3, but they again recovered and began challenging for promotion.

The new millennium saw the non-league pyramid restructured with stricter ground grading requirements. In 2002, Awbridge submitted an unsuccessful application to the Village Hall Committee for redeveloping their dilapidated pavilion. This, along with the high rental costs, forced them to make the difficult decision not to renew the lease and accept an invitation received from their friendly Southampton League neighbours Michelmersh & Timsbury to temporarily join forces until a solution could be found.

This rather unusual arrangement saw the club renamed M&T Awbridge. Playing at the better equipped Timsbury Rec, they were able to maintain their long held county league status,. Two years later the competition was absorbed by the Wessex League, but unable to meet the criteria, they instead became founder members of the Hampshire League 2004.

However, although they performed steadily on the pitch, they were beset with problems off it - most notably in 2005 when a long running dispute between the parent Sports Club and the Parish Council made them homeless. This briefly raised hopes of negotiating a return to Awbridge, but this was not possible as the (now refurbished) pavilion was being leased to a religious group. After a year playing in exile, the dispute was eventually resolved, but part of the condition was that the club be renamed Michelmersh & Timsbury. With little hope of ever returning to the village, it was agreed to accept the offer and Awbridge F.C. was no more after 102 years.

== Honours ==
=== 1st Team ===
- Hampshire Football Association
  - Intermediate Cup Winners 1965/66. Finalists 1966/67 & 1988/89
- Hampshire League
  - Division 3 Runners-up 1984/85
  - Division 3 West Champions 1968/69
  - Division 4 Runners-up 1979/80
- Southampton Football Association
  - Senior Cup Winners 1962/63 & 1963/64, Finalists 1984/85
  - Junior 'A' Cup Finalists 1932/33
- Southampton League
  - Premier Division Champions 1965/66 & 1966/67, Runners-up 1964/65 & 1967/68
  - Senior Division 2 Champions 1954/55, Runners-up 1958/59
  - Junior Division 1 Champions 1952/53
  - Junior Division 2 Runners-up 1951/52
  - Junior Division 3 Champions 1931/32, Runners-up 1949/50
  - Romsey Division Champions 1929/30 & 1930/31
- Salisbury & District League
  - Division 1 Champions 1926/27 & 1929/30
  - Division 2 Champions 1925/26
  - Norman Court Cup Winners 1925/26, 1926/27, 1927/28 & 1932/33
- Other
  - Ampfield & District League Runners-up 1923/24 & 1924/25
  - Wayne Smart Cup Winners 1989, Finalists 1987 & 1988
  - Andover Open Cup Finalists 2005/06

=== 2nd Team ===
- Southampton League
  - Junior Division 2 Champions 1966/67
  - Junior Division 3 Runners-up 1965/66
  - Junior Division 5 Runners-up 1962/63
  - Junior Division 6 Runners-up 1951/52
- Other
  - King's Somborne League Champions 1930/31

== County League record 1968-2006 ==
| Season | Division | Position | Significant events |
|---|---|---|---|
| 1968/69 | Hampshire League Division 3 West | 1/14 | Promoted |
| 1969/70 | Hampshire League Division 2 | 8/16 | |
| 1970/71 | Hampshire League Division 2 | 12/16 | |
| 1971/72 | Hampshire League Division 2 | 15/16 | Relegated |
| 1972/73 | Hampshire League Division 3 | 14/16 | |
| 1973/74 | Hampshire League Division 3 | 15/16 | Relegated |
| 1974/75 | Hampshire League Division 4 | 11/16 | |
| 1975/76 | Hampshire League Division 4 | 12/16 | |
| 1976/77 | Hampshire League Division 4 | 10/14 | |
| 1977/78 | Hampshire League Division 4 | 10/16 | |
| 1978/79 | Hampshire League Division 4 | 10/13 | |
| 1979/80 | Hampshire League Division 4 | 2/12 | Promoted |
| 1980/81 | Hampshire League Division 3 | 7/17 | |
| 1981/82 | Hampshire League Division 3 | 15/16 | |
| 1982/83 | Hampshire League Division 3 | 4/14 | |
| 1983/84 | Hampshire League Division 3 | 8/18 | |
| 1984/85 | Hampshire League Division 3 | 2/18 | Promoted |
| 1985/86 | Hampshire League Division 2 | 6/18 | |
| 1986/87 | Hampshire League Division 1 | 13/18 | Re-organisation due to formation of the Wessex League |
| 1987/88 | Hampshire League Division 1 | 13/18 | |
| 1988/89 | Hampshire League Division 1 | 6/17 | Highest ever final placing |
| 1989/90 | Hampshire League Division 1 | 16/18 | |
| 1990/91 | Hampshire League Division 1 | 10/18 | |
| 1991/92 | Hampshire League Division 1 | 16/18 | |
| 1992/93 | Hampshire League Division 1 | 16/17 | Relegated |
| 1993/94 | Hampshire League Division 2 | 15/17 | |
| 1994/95 | Hampshire League Division 2 | 17/17 | Relegated |
| 1995/96 | Hampshire League Division 3 | 11/18 | |
| 1996/97 | Hampshire League Division 3 | 5/20 | |
| 1997/98 | Hampshire League Division 3 | 6/16 | |
| 1998/99 | Hampshire League Division 3 | 14/19 | |
| 1999/00 | Hampshire League Division 2 | 8/14 | Re-organisation |
| 2000/01 | Hampshire League Division 2 | 9/16 | |
| 2001/02 | Hampshire League Division 2 | 12/16 | |
| 2002/03 | Hampshire League Division 2 | 12/13 | As M&T Awbridge |
| 2003/04 | Hampshire League Division 2 | 12/15 | Competition absorbed by Wessex League |
| 2004/05 | Hampshire League 2004 | 7/16 | |
| 2005/06 | Hampshire League 2004 | 10/17 | Became Michelmersh & Timsbury |

== Ground ==
Awbridge Football Club played at the Village Hall Field, Romsey Road, Awbridge, SO51 0HG. It was their home for over 75 years after the land was allocated to the residents as part of the Awbridge Danes Estate.

The ground had two pitches, with a notorious slope, and the record attendance is believed to be approx 500 for the friendly against AFC Bournemouth as part of the new pavilion opening ceremony in August 1980. The building still remains (dwarfed by the impressive new Village Hall) and is currently used as a storage unit.

== Successor club ==
- See Michelmersh & Timsbury F.C.

== Local rivalries ==
Awbridge had a number of local rivals within the Test Valley district whom they faced many times over the years, and for a sustained spell they were undoubtedly the top team in the area.

Hampshire League meetings with Broughton, Braishfield, Mottisfont and especially Romsey Town always generated much interest and attracted large crowds.

== Print ==
- Awbridge FC - A History of a Village Football Club, by John Moody.
