= Norman Thelwell =

English cartoonist

- Born: 23 May 1923; Birkenhead, England
- Died: 7 February 2004 (aged 80)
- Other name: Thelwell
- Occupations: Cartoonist, comic artist
- Notable work: Penelope and Kipper

Norman Thelwell (3 May 1923 – 7 February 2004) was an English cartoonist well known for his humorous illustrations of ponies and horses. He was also active as a comic artist, drawing the series Penelope and Kipper.

== Life and career ==
Born in Birkenhead, Thelwell spent the Second World War in the East Yorkshire Regiment, having signed up at the age of 18 in 1941, and was art editor of an army magazine in New Delhi, India.

His first published cartoon, in the London Opinion, was an Indian subject.

In 1944, he took evening classes in art at Nottingham Art School. A fellow art student, Rhona, became his wife in 1949. They had one son and one daughter.

After Nottingham, he took a degree at Liverpool College of Art, then in 1950, he took up a post teaching design and illustration at Wolverhampton College of Art, but gave this up to work freelance in 1956.

He became a contributor to the satirical magazine Punch, who first published his work in 1952, beginning a 25-year relationship that resulted in more than 1,500 cartoons, of which 60 were used as front covers. He also worked as political cartoonist for the News Chronicle from 1956 until the paper closed in 1960.

His first collection of cartoons, Angels on Horseback, was published in 1957.

Known to many only as "Thelwell", he found his true comic niche with Pony Club girls and their comic ponies, a subject for which he became best-known, and which led to a cartoon strip about such a pair, Penelope and Kipper. He also illustrated Chicko in the British boys' comic Eagle.

For the last quarter of a century of his life he lived in the Test Valley at Timsbury, near Romsey, gradually restoring a farm house and landscaping the grounds which gave rise in 1978 to his first factual book, A Plank Bridge by a Pool, which detailed the first two lakes he dug there. A third lake was later featured on the BBC's South Today programme. Written much earlier, but published three years later, A Millstone Round My Neck described his experiences in re-building a Cornish water mill (Addicroft Mill at Liskeard, which he called Penruin), which was sold before the book was published. He always loved old buildings, and in his autobiography, Wrestling with a Pencil, wrote about his joy in the beauty of old cottages.

In the 1970s, Thelwell also illustrated the front covers of the first six James Herriot books in the series.

== Exhibitions ==
An exhibition of Thelwell's drawings and cartoons was scheduled to be held at the Nature in Art gallery in Gloucester, England, from 30 July to 1 September 2019.

== Published books ==
- Angels on Horseback (1957)
- Thelwell Country (1959)
- A Place of Your Own – A Guide for House-Hunters (1960)
- Thelwell in Orbit (1961)
- A Leg at Each Corner (1962)
- Top Dog (1964) [Dogs]
- Thelwell's Riding Academy (1965)
- Drawing Ponies (1966)
- Up the Garden Path (1967) [gardening]
- Thelwell's Compleat Tangler (1967) [fishing]
- Thelwell's Book of Leisure (1968)
- This Desirable Plot (1970) [real estate]
- The Effluent Society (1971) [waste and ecology]
- Penelope (1972)
- Three Sheets in the Wind (1973) [sailing]
- Belt Up (1974) [motoring]
- Thelwell Goes West (1975)
- Brat Race (1977)
- Riding Frieze (1977)
- A Plank Bridge by a Pool (1978)
- Thelwell's Gymkhana (1979)
- Horse Sense (1980; previously published as Riding Frieze, 1977)
- A Millstone Round My Neck (1981)
- Pony Calvalcade (1981) (3 in 1: Angels on Horseback, A Leg at Each Corner, Riding Academy)
- Some Damn Fool's Signed the Rubens Again (1982) [owning a stately home]
- Sporting Prints (1982)
- How to Draw Ponies (1982; based on Drawing Ponies, 1966)
- Magnificat (1983) [cats]
- Wrestling with a Pencil: The Life of a Freelance Artist (1986)
- Play It As It Lies (1987) [golfing]
- Pony Panorama (1988) (3 in 1: Gymkhana, Goes West, Penelope)
- Penelope Rides Again (1989)
- The Cat's Pyjamas (1992) [cats]

=== Other published works/or works involved with ===
- The Penguin Thelwell (1963)
- The Delinquent Equine RS Summerhayes and Thelwell (Moss Bros) (undated)
- Thelwell ISBN 1-871136-07-5 (1989) [sale catalogue]
- Ploughmans Punch (1995)
- The Definitive Thelwell ISBN 978-1-905738-14-4 (2009) [sale catalogue]
- Thelwell Country: 70 years of Norman Thelwell ISBN 0-901723-33-9 (2003–4) [exhibition catalogue, Southampton City Art Gallery]

=== Forewords written by/contains some illustrations ===
- Punch Afloat (1974) – contains two sections written by Thelwell, pp. 36 and 80, as well as additional illustrations
- Travelling with a Sketchbook by Ray Evans, foreword by Norman Thelwell (1980)
