= Michelmersh & Timsbury F.C. =

Association football club in England

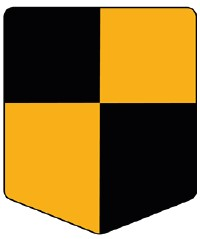
- Full name: Michelmersh & Timsbury Football Club
- Nickname: The 'Marsh
- Founded: 1928
- Ground: Timsbury Recreation Ground, Mannyngham Way
- Chairman: Will Baggs
- Manager: Dave Purkess
- League: Southampton League Premier Division
- Website: https://mandtfc.co.uk/
Home colours	Away colours

Michelmersh & Timsbury F.C. are a long running amateur football club based in Timsbury, a small village and civil parish three miles north of Romsey in the Test Valley district of Hampshire, England,

The club are affiliated to the Hampshire Football Association and are long serving members of the Southampton Football League.

They represent the 'Men's Football Section' of the Michelmersh & Timsbury Sports Club.

== History ==
Michelmersh & Timsbury were formed circa 1928, and initially played friendly fixtures before joining the Eastleigh & District League.

After World War II, they re-grouped and in 1948 joined the Southampton League where they were placed in Junior Division 4. However, it took them until 1977 to reach the Senior section, and then until 1990 for their solitary piece of silverware to arrive when the Reserves were champions of Junior Division 4.

Hampshire League football arrived in 2002 when they 'temporarily merged' with neighbours Awbridge, who were having problems with their ground. For competition purposes, the Men's Football Section was renamed M&T Awbridge until a solution could hopefully be found – this also preserved their tenants long held county status. In 2004 the Hampshire League was absorbed by the Wessex League, but unable to meet the stricter requirements, they instead became founder members of the Hampshire League 2004.

However, a year later they were forced into exile themselves due to a long running dispute between the parent Sports Club and the Parish Council. Eventually, this was resolved, but part of the condition was that they revert back to being known as Michelmersh & Timsbury. With very little chance of ever returning home, the remaining Awbridge members agreed and that club was dissolved.

Initially, Michelmersh continued to perform well; reaching two cup finals and finishing in their highest position of 5th in 2011. But after this, their fortunes declined and by the time the competition was absorbed by the Hampshire Premier League in 2013, they had become perennial strugglers. The club were finally relegated in 2024 to the Southampton League Premier Division.

The veterans continue to perform well, whilst the Junior section has recently seen a rapid increase in popularity which bodes well for the future.

== Honours ==
=== 1st Team ===
- Hampshire League 2004
  - Trophyman League Cup Finalists 2008/09
- Southampton League
  - Junior Division 2 Runners-up 1970/71
  - Junior Division 3 Runners-up 1969/70
  - Junior Division 4 Runners-up 1952/53
- Other
  - Andover Open Cup Finalists 2005/06

=== 2nd Team ===
- Southampton League
  - Junior Division 3 Runners-up 2018/19
  - Junior Division 4 Champions 1989/90

=== Veterans ===
- Southampton Football Association
  - Veterans Cup Finalists 2023/24
- Southampton League
  - Veterans 'B' Division Runners-up 2024/25
  - Supplementary Trophy Winners 2005/06

== County League career 2002–24 ==
Season	Division	Position	Significant events
2002/03	Hampshire League Division 2	12/13	As M&T Awbridge
2003/04	Hampshire League Division 2	12/15	Competition absorbed by Wessex League
2004/05	Hampshire League 2004	7/16	
2005/06	Hampshire League 2004	10/17	
2006/07	Hampshire League 2004	12/16	As Michelmersh & Timsbury
2007/08	Hampshire League 2004	7/15	
2008/09	Hampshire League 2004	8/15	
2009/10	Hampshire League 2004	10/14	
2010/11	Hampshire League 2004	5/17	
2011/12	Hampshire League 2004	10/13	
2012/13	Hampshire League 2004	10/10	Competition absorbed by Hampshire Premier League
2013/14	Hampshire Premier League Division 1	9/11	
2014/15	Hampshire Premier League Division 1	11/11	
2015/16	Hampshire Premier League Division 1	10/11	
2016/17	Hampshire Premier League Division 1	7/9	
2017/18	Hampshire Premier League Division 1	8/8	
2018/19	Hampshire Premier League Division 1	4/8	
2019/20	Hampshire Premier League Division 1		abandoned due to Covid-19
2020/21	Hampshire Premier League Division 1		abandoned due to Covid-19
2021/22	Hampshire Premier League Division 1 South	7/10	
2022/23	Hampshire Premier League Division 1	13/13	
2023/24	Hampshire Premier League Division 1	13/13	Left competition

== Ground ==
Michelmersh & Timsbury FC play at Timsbury Recreation Ground, Mannyngham Way, Timsbury, SO51 0NJ.

The land was donated to the village residents in 1935 as part of the King George V playing fields initiative. The pavilion was opened in 1988 after the original building was destroyed by fire. It has a large function room with licensed bar. The facility is shared with other sections of the parent Sports Club.

The club also use the adjacent Hunts Farm Sports Ground (owned by Test Valley Borough Council) for staging Reserves and Veterans games.

== Notable former players ==
The former AFC Bournemouth, Rochdale and Aldershot striker Jack Howarth regularly played during the 1986/87 campaign. Stalwart Robin Goodland has given over 60 years devoted service.

== Local rivalries ==
Michelmersh & Timsbury have a number of local rivals within the Test Valley district.

They did occasionally play Awbridge and King's Somborne in cup matches, whilst Hampshire League meetings with Broughton, Braishfield, Mottisfont and especially Romsey Town always generated much interest and attracted large crowds.

== Print ==
- Michelmersh & Timsbury FC 1928–2008 – 80th Anniversary Club History by Lee Whitelock
