= 2012–13 Football Conference =

Football Conference
- Season: 2012–13

The 2012–13 Football Conference season was the ninth season in which the Conference consisted of three divisions and the thirty-third season overall. The Conference covers the top two levels of Non-League football in England. The Conference Premier is the fifth highest level of the overall pyramid, whilst the Conference North and Conference South exist at the sixth level. The Conference was won by Mansfield Town who together with Newport County, the winner of the play-off of the National division, were promoted to Football League Two, while the bottom four were relegated to the North or South divisions. The champions of the North and South divisions were promoted to the National division, alongside the play-off winners from each division. The bottom three in each of the North and South divisions were relegated to the premier divisions of the Northern Premier League, Isthmian League or Southern League.

For sponsorship reasons, the Conference Premier was referred to as the Blue Square Bet Premier.

== Conference Premier ==
Conference Premier
- Season: 2012–13
- Champions: Mansfield Town
- Promoted: Mansfield Town; Newport County
- Relegated: AFC Telford United; Barrow; Ebbsfleet United; Stockport County
- Matches: 552
- Goals: 1,590 (2.88 per match)
- Top goalscorer: (England) Matt Green (25 goals)
- Biggest home win: Hyde 7–0 Woking (1 December 2012); Mansfield Town 8–1 Barrow (9 February 2013)
- Biggest away win: Newport County 0–5 Forest Green Rovers (1 January 2013)
- Highest scoring: Nuneaton Town 4–5 Ebbsfleet United (11 August 2012); Mansfield Town 8–1 Barrow (9 February 2013); Woking 5–4 Macclesfield Town (13 April 2013)
- Longest winning run: 12 games Mansfield Town F.C.
- Longest unbeaten run: 13 games Wrexham
- Longest winless run: 30 games AFC Telford United
- Longest losing run: 5 games Kidderminster Harriers; Stockport County
- Highest attendance: 7,405; Grimsby Town 1–1 Lincoln City (1 January 2013)
- Average attendance: 1,849

A total of 24 teams contested the division, including 18 sides from last season, two relegated from the Football League Two, two promoted from the Conference North and two promoted from the Conference South. The League started on 10 August 2012 with previously relegated Hereford United and Macclesfield Town facing each other at Edgar Street and finished on 20 April 2013 with all matches that day kicking off simultaneously. The 2013 Conference Premier play-off final on 5 May 2013 was the first Wembley Stadium final to feature two Welsh clubs, Newport County and Wrexham.

=== Promotion and relegation ===
Teams promoted from 2011–12 Conference North

- Hyde
- Nuneaton Town

Teams promoted from 2011–12 Conference South

- Woking
- Dartford

Teams relegated from 2011–12 Football League Two

- Macclesfield Town
- Hereford United

=== League table ===
Pos	Team	Pld	W	D	L	GF	GA	GD	Pts	Promotion, qualification or relegation
1	Mansfield Town (C, P)	46	30	5	11	92	52	+40	95	Promotion to Football League Two
2	Kidderminster Harriers	46	28	9	9	82	40	+42	93	Qualification for the Conference Premier play-offs
3	Newport County (O, P)	46	25	10	11	85	60	+25	85	Qualification for the Conference Premier play-offs
4	Grimsby Town	46	23	14	9	70	38	+32	83	Qualification for the Conference Premier play-offs
5	Wrexham	46	22	14	10	74	45	+29	80	Qualification for the Conference Premier play-offs
6	Hereford United	46	19	13	14	73	63	+10	70	
7	Luton Town	46	18	13	15	70	62	+8	67	
8	Dartford	46	19	9	18	67	63	+4	66	
9	Braintree Town	46	19	9	18	63	72	−9	66	
10	Forest Green Rovers	46	18	11	17	63	49	+14	65	
11	Macclesfield Town	46	17	12	17	65	70	−5	63	
12	Woking	46	18	8	20	73	81	−8	62	
13	Alfreton Town	46	16	12	18	69	74	−5	60	
14	Cambridge United	46	15	14	17	68	69	−1	59	
15	Nuneaton Town	46	14	15	17	55	63	−8	57	
16	Lincoln City	46	15	11	20	66	73	−7	56	
17	Gateshead	46	13	16	17	58	61	−3	55	
18	Hyde	46	16	7	23	63	75	−12	55	
19	Tamworth	46	15	10	21	55	69	−14	55	
20	Southport	46	14	12	20	72	86	−14	54	
21	Stockport County (R)	46	13	11	22	57	76	−19	50	Relegation to Conference North
22	Barrow (R)	46	11	13	22	45	83	−38	46	Relegation to Conference North
23	Ebbsfleet United (R)	46	8	15	23	55	89	−34	39	Relegation to Conference South
24	AFC Telford United (R)	46	6	17	23	52	79	−27	35	Relegation to Conference North

Source: Football Conference
Rules for classification: 1) points; 2) goal difference; 3) number of goals scored.
(C) Champions; (O) Play-off winners; (P) Promoted; (R) Relegated

=== Play-offs ===
Semifinals
2	Kidderminster Harriers	1	1	2
5	Wrexham	2	3	5
3	Newport County	1	1	2
4	Grimsby Town	0	0	0

Final
5	Wrexham	0
3	Newport County	2

==== First leg ====
23 April 2013	Wrexham	2–1	Kidderminster Harriers	Racecourse Ground, Wrexham
19:45	Artell 45+1'; Ashton 84' (pen.)	Report	Gash 56' (pen.)	Attendance: 6,315; Referee: Charles Breakspear

24 April 2013	Grimsby Town	0–1	Newport County	Blundell Park, Cleethorpes
19:45		Report	Yakubu 89'	Attendance: 5,414; Referee: Graham Horwood

==== Second leg ====
28 April 2013	Kidderminster Harriers	1–3 (2–5 agg.)	Wrexham	Aggborough, Kidderminster
13:30	Dunkley 64'	Report	Ormerod 30'; Vaughan 69' (o.g.); Ashton 85' (pen.)	Attendance: 6,202; Referee: Seb Stockbridge

28 April 2013	Newport County	1–0 (2–0 agg.)	Grimsby Town	Rodney Parade, Newport
16:30	Jolley 31'	Report		Attendance: 6,615; Referee: Kinsley

==== Final ====
5 May 2013	Wrexham	0–2	Newport County	Wembley Stadium, London
15:00 BST UTC+1		Report	Jolley 86'; O'Connor 90+4'	Attendance: 16,346; Referee: Michael Bull

=== Stadia and locations ===
Locations of the Conference Premier 2012–13 teams

Team	Stadium	Capacity
Stockport County	Edgeley Park	10,852
Wrexham	Racecourse Ground	10,500*
Luton Town	Kenilworth Road	10,226
Lincoln City	Sincil Bank	10,120
Gateshead	Gateshead International Stadium	10,000***
Mansfield Town	Field Mill	10,000
Cambridge United	Abbey Stadium	9,617
Grimsby Town	Blundell Park	9,546
Macclesfield Town	Moss Rose	6,355
AFC Telford United	New Bucks Head	6,300
Kidderminster Harriers	Aggborough	6,238
Woking	Kingfield Stadium	6,036
Southport	Haig Avenue	6,008
Hereford United	Edgar Street	5,075
Newport County	Rodney Parade	5,511** ^{1}
Forest Green Rovers	The New Lawn	5,147
Ebbsfleet United	Stonebridge Road	5,011
Nuneaton Town	Liberty Way	4,314
Barrow	Holker Street	4,256
Hyde	Ewen Fields	4,250
Braintree Town	Cressing Road	4,145
Dartford	Princes Park	4,100
Tamworth	The Lamb Ground	4,000
Alfreton Town	North Street	3,600

* Restricted due to stadium expansion or FA ruling.
** Capacity reduced for football matches from maximum capacity of 11,676.
*** Groundshare from 15 February 2013.

^{1} Capacity was temporarily raised to 7,012 for the play-off tie against Grimsby Town

=== Results ===
Home \ Away	TEL	ALF	BRW	BRA	CAM	DAR	EBB	FGR	GAT	GRI	HER	HYD	KID	LIN	LUT	MAC	MAN	NPC	NUN	SOU	STP	TAM	WOK	WRE
AFC Telford United		0–0	1–1	3–0	1–2	0–2	2–2	1–2	0–0	1–2	0–4	1–3	0–2	1–1	0–0	0–2	2–2	2–4	0–3	1–3	2–2	3–3	1–0	0–2
Alfreton Town	1–1		4–0	1–1	1–1	3–2	3–0	2–1	3–2	0–2	0–3	5–1	1–1	0–2	3–0	1–2	0–3	4–3	0–3	3–3	2–3	3–0	0–3	1–2
Barrow	0–0	1–3		0–1	1–4	0–0	1–1	2–2	0–2	2–2	0–2	1–1	1–1	1–2	1–0	1–0	0–4	0–3	1–2	3–2	0–2	2–0	2–0	0–1
Braintree Town	3–2	2–1	2–3		0–3	0–2	3–1	3–1	2–1	2–0	0–2	2–2	1–1	0–3	2–0	0–3	2–1	1–2	2–2	1–3	0–0	2–1	1–1	1–5
Cambridge United	3–3	0–3	2–1	1–0		1–2	1–1	0–0	3–0	0–0	1–3	0–1	1–3	2–1	2–2	2–0	4–1	0–0	1–3	2–0	4–1	1–1	1–0	1–4
Dartford	1–4	5–1	0–1	0–0	1–1		3–1	0–1	3–0	1–2	4–0	2–1	1–0	2–4	1–0	2–0	2–0	2–1	0–1	2–2	1–1	2–3	4–1	2–1
Ebbsfleet United	1–3	0–0	2–4	0–1	2–4	2–2		0–2	3–1	1–1	1–0	3–2	1–1	1–1	1–3	0–4	3–1	1–1	1–1	4–1	0–0	1–1	2–2	1–1
Forest Green Rovers	0–0	1–1	1–1	4–1	1–1	2–3	4–1		1–0	0–1	0–1	3–1	0–1	3–0	1–2	1–1	1–2	1–2	1–0	0–1	4–1	1–2	3–1	0–0
Gateshead	1–1	2–0	0–1	1–2	0–0	2–0	2–0	1–1		1–1	3–2	3–0	2–0	1–1	5–1	2–2	4–1	0–0	0–2	2–2	1–1	0–2	2–1	0–1
Grimsby Town	1–0	4–2	0–0	3–0	0–1	0–2	3–1	1–0	3–0		1–1	2–0	1–3	1–1	4–1	0–1	4–1	3–0	0–0	2–2	1–2	2–0	5–1	1–0
Hereford United	1–1	3–3	2–1	0–0	4–2	1–0	4–2	1–2	1–1	0–2		1–2	0–1	3–2	1–0	2–1	1–2	2–3	0–0	2–2	1–2	5–2	2–1	0–1
Hyde	2–1	1–1	0–0	1–2	2–1	3–0	1–0	0–1	1–1	3–2	5–2		0–4	1–5	1–2	1–1	0–1	0–1	2–2	0–2	0–1	2–1	7–0	2–0
Kidderminster Harriers	1–0	3–1	2–0	2–1	3–2	5–1	3–2	0–1	1–1	0–0	0–1	3–0		3–0	0–2	3–0	2–3	3–2	1–0	2–2	4–0	4–1	2–2	2–0
Lincoln City	3–2	1–2	0–0	3–0	0–0	2–1	1–1	1–2	1–1	1–4	3–2	3–2	1–0		1–2	2–3	0–1	2–4	2–1	1–0	3–3	2–1	0–2	1–2
Luton Town	0–1	3–0	6–1	2–3	3–2	0–2	2–0	1–1	2–2	1–1	1–1	1–2	1–2	3–0		4–1	2–3	2–2	2–0	3–1	1–0	0–0	3–1	0–0
Macclesfield Town	2–1	1–2	2–0	2–1	2–1	2–0	1–2	1–2	0–4	1–3	0–1	3–2	1–0	2–1	1–1		0–3	1–1	0–0	2–2	1–1	2–0	0–0	2–0
Mansfield Town	1–0	1–2	8–1	2–0	3–1	5–0	4–1	1–0	4–0	2–0	1–1	1–0	0–2	0–0	2–2	3–1		3–4	1–0	1–0	4–1	2–0	3–1	1–0
Newport County	2–1	2–0	0–2	1–0	6–2	0–0	1–0	0–5	3–1	0–0	2–0	1–3	1–2	2–1	5–2	4–1	2–0		4–0	2–1	0–0	2–2	2–3	1–1
Nuneaton Town	3–1	1–0	1–1	2–4	2–2	1–0	4–5	1–1	0–1	1–0	0–0	3–1	0–1	1–0	0–0	3–3	1–1	1–2		0–1	2–0	2–1	0–0	0–0
Southport	0–3	0–2	5–2	0–2	2–1	2–2	1–0	1–2	2–1	1–1	2–2	0–1	1–3	4–2	1–3	3–2	1–2	0–2	3–1		1–1	0–3	1–2	1–4
Stockport County	2–2	1–0	3–1	1–3	1–1	0–1	3–1	2–1	1–2	1–2	2–3	0–2	1–0	2–0	0–1	3–4	1–3	1–0	3–2	3–4		0–1	1–2	2–3
Tamworth	0–0	1–1	1–3	1–4	1–2	3–2	0–1	2–1	2–0	0–1	2–2	2–0	0–1	1–0	1–2	0–0	0–1	1–2	2–1	2–1	1–0		2–1	0–1
Woking	5–2	1–2	3–1	1–4	2–1	1–0	1–0	2–0	2–1	0–1	1–1	2–1	2–2	1–1	3–1	5–4	1–2	1–3	6–1	2–3	1–0	2–3		2–0
Wrexham	4–1	1–1	3–0	1–1	1–0	2–2	4–1	2–1	1–1	0–0	1–2	2–0	1–2	2–4	0–0	0–0	2–1	2–0	6–1	2–2	3–1	2–2	3–1	

Updated to match(es) played on 20 April 2013. Source: Football Conference
Legend: Blue = home team win; Yellow = draw; Red = away team win.

=== Top scorers ===
As of 21 April 2013

Rank	Player	Club	Goals
1	(England) Matt Green	Mansfield Town	25
2	(England) Adam Cunnington	Tamworth	21
3	(England) Michael Gash	Kidderminster Harriers	20
4	(England) Andy Brown	Nuneaton Town	19
4	(England) Anthony Malbon	Kidderminster Harriers	19
6	(England) Matthew Barnes-Homer	Macclesfield Town	18
6	(Grenada) Bradley Bubb	Woking	18
6	(England) Aaron O'Connor	Newport County	18
9	(England) Paul Clayton	Alfreton Town	17
9	(Jamaica) Andre Gray	Luton Town	17

== Conference North ==
Conference North
- Season: 2012–13
- Champions: Chester
- Promoted: FC Halifax Town
- Relegated: Corby Town; Droylsden; Hinckley United
- Matches: 462
- Goals: 1,444 (3.13 per match)
- Biggest home win: FC Halifax Town 7–0 Hinckley United
- Biggest away win: Droylsden 0–7 Bradford Park Avenue (3 March 2013)
- Highest scoring: Corby Town 4–5 Bradford Park Avenue (1 September 2012)
- Highest attendance: 3,685 Chester 1–0 Boston United (6 April 2013)
- Lowest attendance: 99; Harrogate Town (29 January 2013 v Corby Town F.C.)

A total of 22 teams competed in the division, including 18 sides which competed in the Conference North the previous season, two promoted from the Southern Football League and two from the Northern Premier League.

=== Promotion and relegation ===
Teams promoted from 2011–12 Northern Premier League Premier Division

- Chester
- Bradford Park Avenue

Teams promoted from 2011–12 Southern League Premier Division

- Brackley Town
- Oxford City

=== League table ===
Pos	Team	Pld	W	D	L	GF	GA	GD	Pts	Promotion, qualification or relegation
1	Chester (C, P)	42	34	5	3	103	32	+71	107	Promotion to Conference Premier
2	Guiseley	42	28	7	7	83	45	+38	91	Qualification for the Conference North play-offs
3	Brackley Town	42	26	7	9	76	44	+32	85	Qualification for the Conference North play-offs
4	Altrincham	42	24	8	10	100	51	+49	80	Qualification for the Conference North play-offs
5	FC Halifax Town (O, P)	42	21	12	9	86	38	+48	75	Qualification for the Conference North play-offs
6	Harrogate Town	42	20	9	13	72	50	+22	69	
7	Bradford (Park Avenue)	42	19	9	14	75	52	+23	66	
8	Gainsborough Trinity	42	18	12	12	68	45	+23	66	
9	Solihull Moors	42	17	9	16	57	53	+4	56 (Note: Solihull Moors were deducted three points on 30 May for fielding an ineligible player.)	
10	Oxford City	42	13	16	13	62	57	+5	55	
11	Gloucester City	42	16	6	20	54	63	−9	54	
12	Vauxhall Motors	42	15	8	19	58	64	−6	53	
13	Stalybridge Celtic	42	13	13	16	55	62	−7	52	
14	Workington	42	16	8	18	60	68	−8	52 (Note: Workington were deducted 4 points on 29 January for fielding an ineligible player.)	
15	Worcester City	42	14	8	20	57	62	−5	50	
16	Boston United	42	14	7	21	68	73	−5	49	
17	Bishop's Stortford	42	12	13	17	58	74	−16	49	Transferred to Conference South
18	Colwyn Bay	42	14	7	21	57	78	−21	49	
19	Histon	42	11	11	20	48	73	−25	44	
20	Corby Town (R)	42	12	8	22	66	92	−26	44	Relegation to the Southern League Premier Division
21	Droylsden (R)	42	5	7	30	43	124	−81	22	Relegation to the Northern Premier League Premier Division
22	Hinckley United (R)	42	3	4	35	37	143	−106	7 (Note: Hinckley United were deducted three points on 13 December for failing to pay football creditors, and a further three points on 15 April for failing to fulfil their fixture against Bishop's Stortford on 18 December.)	Relegation to the Southern League Premier Division

Source: Football Conference
Rules for classification: 1) points; 2) goal difference; 3) number of goals scored.
(C) Champions; (O) Play-off winners; (P) Promoted; (R) Relegated

=== Play-offs ===
Semifinals
2	Guiseley	1	0	1
5	FC Halifax Town	1	2	3
3	Brackley Town	1	3	4
4	Altrincham	2	0	2

Final
3	Brackley Town	0
5	FC Halifax Town	1

==== First leg ====
30 April 2013	Altrincham	2–1	Brackley Town	Moss Lane, Altrincham
19:45	Richman 77'; Moult 90'	Report	Louis 70'	Attendance: 1,618

30 April 2013	FC Halifax Town	1–1	Guiseley	The Shay, Halifax
20:00	Gardner 17'	Report	Ellis 60'	Attendance: 2,367

==== Second leg ====
4 May 2013	Guiseley	0–2	FC Halifax Town	Nethermoor Park, Guiseley
15:00		Report	A. Johnson 51'; Gregory 82'	Attendance: 2,424

4 May 2013	Brackley Town	3–0	Altrincham	St James Park, Brackley
15:00	Louis 4'; Reid 25'; Walker 53'	Report		Attendance: 1,353

==== Final ====
12 May 2013	Brackley Town	0–1	FC Halifax Town	St James Park, Brackley
15:00			Gregory 76'	Attendance: 2,604

=== Stadia and locations ===
Locations of the Conference North 2011–12 teams
Locations of the Conference North 2011–12 teams

Team	Stadium	Capacity
Altrincham	Moss Lane	6,085
Bishop's Stortford	Woodside Park	4,000
Boston United	York Street	6,643
Brackley Town	St James Park	3,500
Bradford Park Avenue	Horsfall Stadium	3,500
Chester	Deva Stadium	6,000
Colwyn Bay	Llanelian Road	2,500
Corby Town	Steel Park	3,893
Droylsden	Butcher's Arms Ground	3,000
FC Halifax Town	The Shay	14,061
Gainsborough Trinity	The Northolme	4,304
Gloucester City	Whaddon Road (Groundshare with Cheltenham Town)	7,066
Guiseley	Nethermoor Park	3,000
Harrogate Town	Wetherby Road	3,800
Hinckley United	Greene King Stadium	4,329
Histon	Bridge Road	4,300
Oxford City	Court Place Farm	2,000
Solihull Moors	Damson Park	3,050
Stalybridge Celtic	Bower Fold	6,500
Vauxhall Motors	Rivacre Park	2,500
Worcester City	St George's Lane	4,850
Workington	Borough Park	3,101

=== Results ===
Home \ Away	ALT	BST	BOS	BRK	BPA	CHR	COL	COR	DRO	HAL	GAI	GLO	GUI	HAR	HIN	HIS	OXC	SOL	STL	VAU	WRC	WRK
Altrincham		2–1	7–1	1–4	3–1	2–4	1–1	2–1	6–0	2–0	0–1	2–0	1–3	3–0	8–0	5–0	3–1	2–1	2–1	1–0	2–0	1–2
Bishop's Stortford	1–1		1–0	1–3	2–1	1–2	2–2	2–1	2–1	1–2	1–5	1–2	2–5	0–2	1–1	3–1	0–0	4–1	0–0	2–2	0–1	0–3
Boston United	2–3	1–1		3–4	0–4	3–2	1–0	1–1	5–1	1–2	2–1	4–0	1–3	1–2	1–2	6–0	3–1	2–2	2–2	0–1	1–2	1–3
Brackley Town	0–1	1–0	0–2		3–1	2–3	1–3	2–4	3–2	0–0	2–2	0–1	1–0	2–1	5–0	2–1	0–0	2–1	4–1	1–0	2–0	3–1
Bradford Park Avenue	2–2	2–1	2–1	0–1		0–0	1–2	2–0	5–0	1–1	0–2	2–1	1–3	1–0	4–0	0–0	1–2	1–0	1–3	2–0	2–2	1–0
Chester	2–0	4–1	1–0	0–0	1–1		2–1	2–1	5–0	2–1	3–1	2–0	4–0	2–0	3–0	2–1	2–0	0–1	4–1	2–0	4–2	1–0
Colwyn Bay	1–3	1–2	0–2	1–1	1–2	1–5		1–0	1–3	0–3	1–0	1–0	0–2	1–2	3–2	3–1	3–1	3–1	2–3	2–4	0–3	1–4
Corby Town	2–5	2–2	2–1	0–4	4–5	1–2	3–1		5–0	1–5	0–0	3–2	2–3	0–2	5–3	0–0	1–1	2–3	1–0	0–1	1–0	1–3
Droylsden	0–5	1–2	0–1	0–3	0–7	3–4	2–0	2–2		0–6	1–3	1–0	0–3	1–3	3–2	2–2	1–3	2–4	1–1	5–2	0–2	0–1
FC Halifax Town	3–4	1–1	1–2	0–0	0–1	1–1	0–1	2–0	4–1		3–1	5–0	1–1	1–2	7–0	3–3	3–1	0–0	0–0	4–0	5–0	5–1
Gainsborough Trinity	2–4	2–2	2–2	0–1	1–1	0–2	3–1	2–2	3–0	3–0		0–1	1–2	1–1	5–0	1–0	1–2	1–1	1–2	2–1	1–0	1–1
Gloucester City	0–0	5–1	1–0	1–4	1–0	0–1	2–2	0–1	4–0	1–2	1–2		2–2	0–2	4–1	1–1	0–1	1–1	4–3	1–1	4–2	0–1
Guiseley	1–1	1–2	2–1	0–2	1–0	2–1	2–2	2–1	7–1	1–1	2–0	3–1		2–0	2–4	2–1	1–0	1–0	1–0	2–1	3–3	2–0
Harrogate Town	1–2	2–2	4–2	6–1	1–1	1–3	1–2	6–1	1–1	1–1	0–0	1–0	1–2		5–0	2–0	1–3	2–4	0–0	3–1	3–1	3–1
Hinckley United	0–6	1–5	2–4	1–3	1–4	0–6	1–3	6–3	2–2	0–2	0–2	0–3	0–3	0–2		0–1	0–2	1–1	0–3	0–6	0–5	1–1
Histon	2–0	2–0	1–1	3–0	1–4	1–4	2–1	3–4	3–1	0–1	0–3	2–1	1–4	1–3	2–1		1–1	0–0	0–2	2–0	0–0	3–0
Oxford City	2–2	1–1	4–2	2–1	1–1	0–1	1–2	2–0	2–2	2–2	1–1	1–2	0–3	0–0	6–2	0–0		1–2	0–0	1–1	2–2	5–0
Solihull Moors	2–1	0–1	1–0	0–1	3–1	0–3	2–0	3–0	2–1	0–3	0–2	2–3	2–0	2–0	1–0	1–1	1–2		1–0	2–3	0–1	2–2
Stalybridge Celtic	2–2	3–1	0–1	0–3	2–0	2–6	3–3	1–2	0–0	1–0	1–1	4–0	1–1	1–0	4–0	2–1	2–2	0–3		0–1	0–2	1–4
Vauxhall Motors	2–1	2–2	4–0	0–2	1–3	0–3	1–1	1–1	4–0	1–3	1–2	1–2	2–0	0–1	2–1	2–0	2–1	2–1	0–0		1–0	1–3
Worcester City	0–0	2–0	0–3	1–2	2–0	0–1	2–0	5–1	2–1	0–1	0–3	0–1	0–1	2–2	3–1	2–3	3–2	1–3	1–2	2–2		1–1
Workington	2–1	2–3	1–1	0–0	1–6	1–1	1–2	2–3	2–1	0–1	0–3	0–1	0–2	1–2	2–1	3–1	1–2	1–1	4–1	3–1	1–0	

Updated to match(es) played on 27 April 2013. Source: Football Conference
Legend: Blue = home team win; Yellow = draw; Red = away team win.

=== Top scorers ===
As of 29 April 2013

Rank	Player	Club	Goals
1	(England) Damian Reeves	Altrincham	36
2	(England) Marc Newsham	Boston United	21
3	(England) Lee Gregory	FC Halifax Town	20
3	(England) Josh Wilson	Guiseley	20
5	(England) Gareth Arnison	Workington	19
6	(England) Richard Marshall	Bradford Park Avenue	16
7	(England) Omar Bogle	Solihull Moors	15
8	(England) Nathan Jarman	Chester FC	14
8	(England) James Walshaw	Guiseley	14
8	(England) Duncan Watmore	Altrincham	14
8	(Montserrat) Spencer Weir-Daley	Boston United	14

== Conference South ==
Conference South
- Season: 2012–13
- Champions: Welling United
- Promoted: Salisbury City
- Relegated: Truro City; Billericay Town; AFC Hornchurch
- Goals: 1,407

A total of 22 teams competed in the division, including 18 sides which competed in the Conference South the previous season, two relegated from the Conference Premier and two promoted from the Isthmian Premier League.

=== Promotion and relegation ===
Teams promoted from 2011–12 Isthmian League Premier Division

- Billericay Town
- AFC Hornchurch

Teams relegated from 2011–12 Conference Premier

- Bath City
- Hayes & Yeading United

=== League table ===
Pos	Team	Pld	W	D	L	GF	GA	GD	Pts	Promotion, qualification or relegation
1	Welling United (C, P)	42	26	8	8	90	44	+46	86	Promotion to Conference Premier
2	Salisbury City (O, P)	42	25	8	9	80	47	+33	82 (Note: Salisbury City were deducted 1 point for fielding an ineligible player.)	Qualification for the Conference South play-offs
3	Dover Athletic	42	22	10	10	69	44	+25	76	Qualification for the Conference South play-offs
4	Eastleigh	42	22	6	14	79	61	+18	72	Qualification for the Conference South play-offs
5	Chelmsford City	42	22	6	14	70	56	+14	72	Qualification for the Conference South play-offs
6	Sutton United	42	20	10	12	66	49	+17	70	
7	Weston-super-Mare	42	19	10	13	61	55	+6	67	
8	Dorchester Town	42	19	8	15	59	62	−3	65	
9	Boreham Wood	42	15	17	10	59	46	+13	62	
10	Havant & Waterlooville	42	14	16	12	68	60	+8	58	
11	Bath City	42	15	10	17	60	58	+2	55	
12	Eastbourne Borough	42	14	9	19	42	52	−10	51	
13	Farnborough	42	19	7	16	76	75	+1	50 (Note: Farnborough were deducted 4 points for fielding an ineligible player. On 26 April they were deducted a further 10 points for going into administration.)	
14	Basingstoke Town	42	12	12	18	63	73	−10	48	
15	Bromley	42	14	6	22	54	69	−15	48	
16	Tonbridge Angels	42	12	12	18	56	77	−21	48	
17	Hayes & Yeading United	42	13	9	20	64	89	−25	48	
18	Staines Town	42	13	8	21	61	78	−17	47	
19	Maidenhead United	42	13	6	23	64	68	−4	45	
20	AFC Hornchurch (R)	42	11	11	20	47	64	−17	44	Relegation to the Isthmian League Premier Division
21	Billericay Town (R)	42	11	7	24	62	90	−28	40	Relegation to the Isthmian League Premier Division
22	Truro City (R)	42	9	8	25	57	90	−33	25 (Note: Truro City were deducted 10 points for going into administration.)	Relegation to the Southern League Premier Division

Source: Football Conference
Rules for classification: 1) points; 2) goal difference; 3) number of goals scored.
(C) Champions; (O) Play-off winners; (P) Promoted; (R) Relegated

=== Play-offs ===
Semifinals
2	Salisbury City	0	2	2
5	Chelmsford City	1	0	1
3	Dover Athletic	3	0 (4)	3
4	Eastleigh	1	2 (2)	3

Final
2	Salisbury City	3
3	Dover Athletic	2

==== First leg ====
30 April 2013	Chelmsford City	1–0	Salisbury City	Melbourne Stadium, Chelmsford
19:45	Cook 89' (pen.)	Report		Attendance: 1,248

30 April 2013	Eastleigh	1–3	Dover Athletic	Silverlake Stadium, Eastleigh
19:45	Zebroski 66'	Report	Ademola 1'; May 18'; McMahon 90'	Attendance: 915

==== Second leg ====
4 May 2013	Salisbury City	2–0	Chelmsford City	The Raymond McEnhill Stadium, Salisbury
	White 45'; Sinclair 90+1'	Report		Attendance: 1,554

4 May 2013	Dover Athletic	0–2 (a.e.t.) (4–2 p)	Eastleigh	Crabble Athletic Ground, River
		Report	Southam 50'; Scannell 90'	Attendance: 1,662

==== Final ====
11 May 2013	Salisbury City	3–2 (a.e.t.)	Dover Athletic	The Raymond McEnhill Stadium, Salisbury
	White 2'; Wellard 50'; Sinclair 99'		Bricknell 2'; Simpempa 89'	Attendance: 3,408

=== Stadia and locations ===
Locations of the Conference South 2011–12 teams

Team	Stadium	Capacity
AFC Hornchurch	Hornchurch Stadium	3,500
Basingstoke Town	The Camrose	6,000
Bath City	Twerton Park	8,840
Billericay Town	New Lodge	3,500
Boreham Wood	Meadow Park	4,502
Bromley	Courage Stadium	6,000
Chelmsford City	Melbourne Stadium	3,019
Dorchester Town	The Avenue Stadium	5,009
Dover Athletic	Crabble Athletic Ground	6,500
Eastbourne Borough	Priory Lane	4,134
Eastleigh	Silverlake Stadium	3,000
Farnborough	Cherrywood Road	4,000
Havant & Waterlooville	West Leigh Park	5,250
Hayes & Yeading United	Kingfield Stadium (Groundshare with Woking)	6,036
Maidenhead United	York Road	3,000
Salisbury City	The Raymond McEnhill Stadium	5,000
Staines Town	Wheatsheaf Park	3,009
Sutton United	Gander Green Lane	7,032
Tonbridge Angels	Longmead Stadium	3,000
Truro City	Treyew Road	3,500
Welling United	Park View Road	4,000
Weston-super-Mare	Woodspring Stadium	3,500

=== Results ===
Home \ Away	AFC	BAS	BAT	BIL	BOR	BRO	CHE	DOR	DOV	EAB	EAS	FAR	H&W	H&Y	MDH	SAL	STA	SUT	TON	TRU	WEL	WSM
AFC Hornchurch		3–0	2–1	1–0	1–1	1–0	0–2	1–0	0–1	0–1	1–0	1–1	2–2	2–0	0–2	2–2	1–1	1–1	1–1	1–2	0–3	0–0
Basingstoke Town	0–2		2–1	3–3	2–3	1–1	1–2	2–1	0–1	2–2	0–3	6–2	1–2	2–2	2–0	0–4	3–1	2–1	1–0	3–2	0–1	1–3
Bath City	3–1	1–1		2–1	0–0	0–2	2–2	2–3	1–2	2–2	1–1	3–2	2–0	2–3	3–1	0–0	0–1	0–4	3–0	1–1	1–0	1–2
Billericay Town	1–1	1–3	2–0		1–1	2–3	0–1	3–1	1–2	1–2	4–0	2–1	3–1	4–1	1–0	1–2	2–3	2–4	3–3	2–1	1–2	0–0
Boreham Wood	2–1	1–1	0–0	3–0		1–2	0–0	1–2	1–1	2–1	3–0	3–1	1–2	3–0	2–1	1–0	1–1	3–0	4–2	0–0	1–1	0–1
Bromley	4–0	1–2	1–0	0–1	1–1		2–0	2–1	0–4	0–2	3–1	1–3	1–1	0–4	3–2	1–2	0–0	0–2	1–1	4–0	0–2	0–1
Chelmsford City	1–4	2–0	0–1	1–1	2–1	3–2		4–0	0–3	1–0	1–1	6–0	1–1	6–2	3–1	2–1	3–2	1–0	2–1	3–2	2–3	2–1
Dorchester Town	3–1	2–2	2–1	6–1	0–0	0–4	1–0		1–0	2–1	1–0	2–0	0–0	2–2	4–0	2–1	0–4	0–1	1–2	2–2	2–1	2–1
Dover Athletic	1–0	0–5	2–0	4–1	0–1	1–0	0–1	0–0		0–0	2–0	2–2	2–2	2–1	2–0	1–3	0–1	1–1	0–1	3–2	3–2	3–1
Eastbourne Borough	1–1	1–0	0–3	2–1	1–1	3–0	1–2	0–0	0–3		1–0	0–1	0–1	2–1	0–2	1–2	2–0	0–1	1–2	1–0	0–3	0–2
Eastleigh	1–0	1–1	3–1	5–0	1–1	3–0	1–0	3–1	1–3	1–0		3–1	2–2	3–1	4–2	1–0	4–3	1–0	4–1	3–1	1–3	3–0
Farnborough	1–1	2–1	0–1	4–3	0–3	2–0	3–1	1–1	5–2	0–1	6–2		1–1	4–1	2–1	2–1	3–1	1–3	4–1	4–1	0–3	2–1
Havant & Waterlooville	5–2	4–1	2–1	5–0	1–1	1–2	1–1	4–0	1–1	2–3	0–3	0–1		2–1	2–1	2–2	3–1	3–0	2–2	1–0	0–1	0–3
Hayes & Yeading United	1–3	2–1	2–2	4–2	0–1	1–1	3–0	1–3	2–4	1–1	2–1	3–2	1–4		1–1	2–3	4–0	0–0	3–2	1–2	2–1	2–1
Maidenhead United	2–4	2–2	0–1	3–2	2–1	4–2	2–1	1–2	1–2	1–2	0–2	3–2	2–0	0–2		0–1	1–1	0–1	3–1	8–0	2–1	0–1
Salisbury City	2–1	0–2	3–2	2–0	2–2	3–1	3–2	4–0	1–1	1–0	5–3	1–0	5–1	2–0	1–1		3–1	1–0	2–0	4–3	2–1	1–1
Staines Town	3–1	2–0	1–3	1–2	1–1	3–1	1–3	2–1	0–2	0–2	1–3	1–2	1–1	7–1	0–6	3–2		1–4	1–4	1–0	2–2	1–1
Sutton United	3–1	3–2	0–2	3–0	2–1	4–3	1–0	1–2	2–2	2–0	2–1	0–1	1–1	5–1	1–1	1–0	1–2		2–2	0–1	2–1	1–3
Tonbridge Angels	1–0	0–0	3–4	1–1	4–2	0–3	0–4	0–2	2–1	1–1	3–1	2–3	1–0	1–1	2–1	1–2	1–0	1–1		3–2	1–1	1–1
Truro City	3–2	2–2	2–1	2–4	2–0	0–1	1–2	1–2	0–3	2–2	1–3	3–3	3–3	3–1	0–1	1–1	0–3	1–2	2–0		0–3	1–2
Welling United	4–0	1–1	1–1	5–2	4–0	3–1	3–0	3–2	1–1	2–0	1–1	2–0	1–0	3–0	3–2	1–0	3–2	2–2	4–1	4–3		4–1
Weston-super-Mare	1–0	5–2	1–4	1–0	2–4	3–0	3–0	2–0	0–3	3–2	2–4	1–1	2–2	1–1	1–1	0–3	1–0	1–1	2–0	0–2	2–0	

Updated to match(es) played on 22 April 2013. Source: Football Conference
Legend: Blue = home team win; Yellow = draw; Red = away team win.

=== Top scorers ===
As of 29 April 2013

Rank	Player	Club	Goals
1	(England) Ollie Palmer	Havant & Waterlooville	25
2	(England) Jamie Slabber	Chelmsford City	23
3	(England) Jamie White	Salisbury City	21
4	(Wales) Kieffer Moore	Dorchester Town	20
5	(England) Francis Collin	Tonbridge Angels	19
5	(England) Ross Lafayette	Welling United	19
5	(England) Ben May	Dover Athletic	19
8	(England) Dan Fitchett	Salisbury City	18
8	(England) Jai Reason	Eastleigh	18
10	(Scotland) Craig McAllister	Eastleigh	17
11	(France) Pierre Joseph-Dubois	Bromley	16
