= Crouay =

- Commune
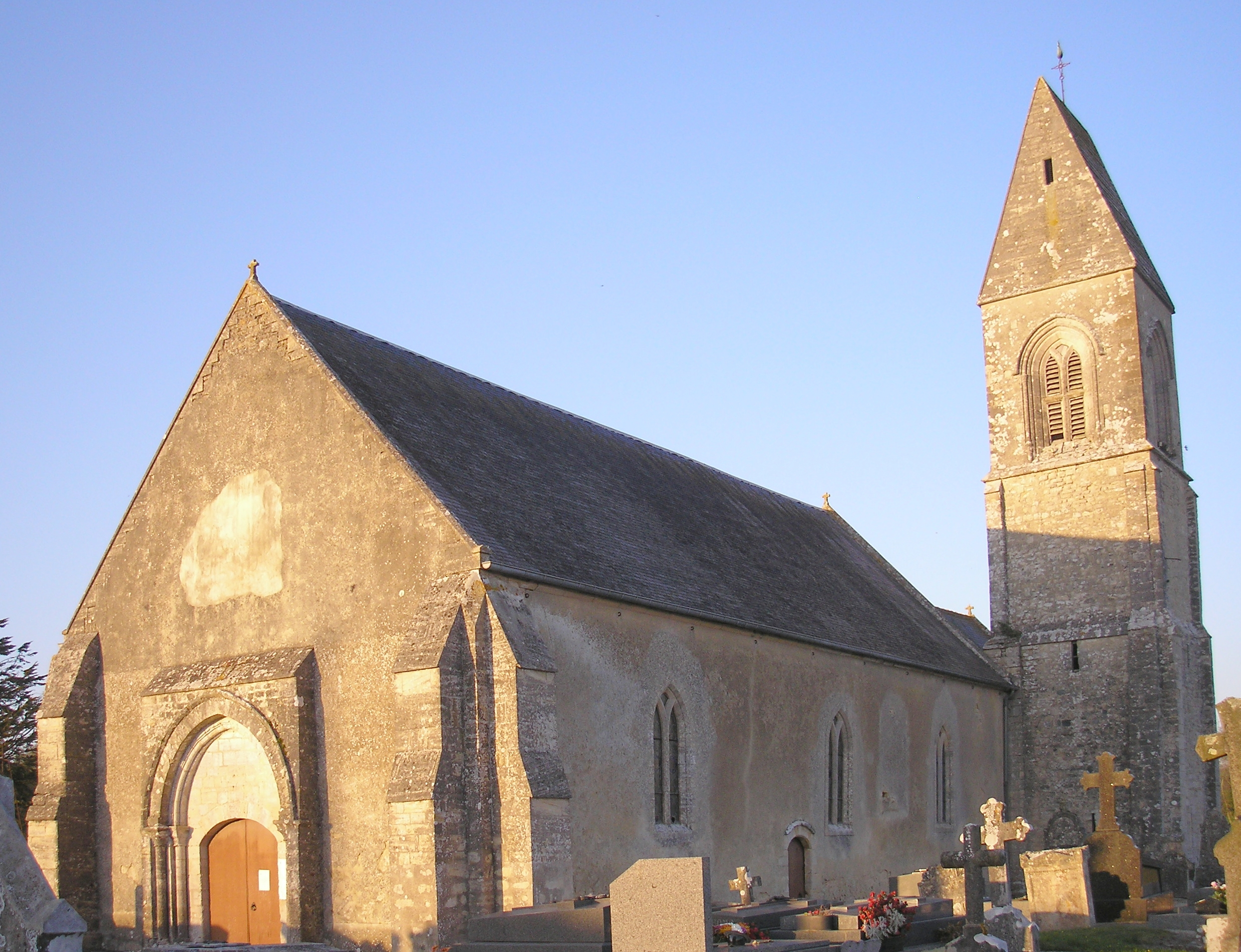
- The church in Crouay

- Coat of arms
- Location of Crouay
- Location within France Location within Normandy
- Coordinates: 49°16′05″N 0°48′22″W
- Country: France
- Region: Normandy
- Department: Calvados
- Arrondissement: Bayeux
- Canton: Trévières
- Intercommunality: CC Isigny-Omaha Intercom

Government
  - Mayor (2020–2026): Fabienne Leroy
- Area^{1}: 7.73 km^{2} (2.98 sq mi)
- Elevation: 44 m (144 ft)
- Highest elevation: 81 m (266 ft)
- Lowest elevation: 24 m (79 ft)
- Population (2023): 510
  - Density: 66/km^{2} (170/sq mi)
- Time zone: UTC+01:00 (CET)
  - Summer (DST): UTC+02:00 (CEST)
- INSEE/Postal code: 14209 /14400
- ^{1} French Land Register data, which excludes lakes, ponds, glaciers > 1 km^{2} (0.386 sq mi or 247 acres) and river estuaries.

Crouay (French pronunciation: [kʁuɛ]) is a commune in the Calvados department in the Normandy region in northwestern France.

== International relations ==
Crouay is twinned with Braishfield, United Kingdom.

== Population ==
Historical population
Year	Pop.	±% p.a.
1968	331	—
1975	352	+0.88%
1982	397	+1.73%
1990	444	+1.41%
1999	417	−0.69%
2007	516	+2.70%
2012	550	+1.28%
2017	529	−0.78%
2023	510	−0.61%
Source: INSEE

== See also ==
- Communes of the Calvados department
