= Braishfield =

Village and parish in Hampshire, England

Coordinates: 51.02429°N 1.46662°W

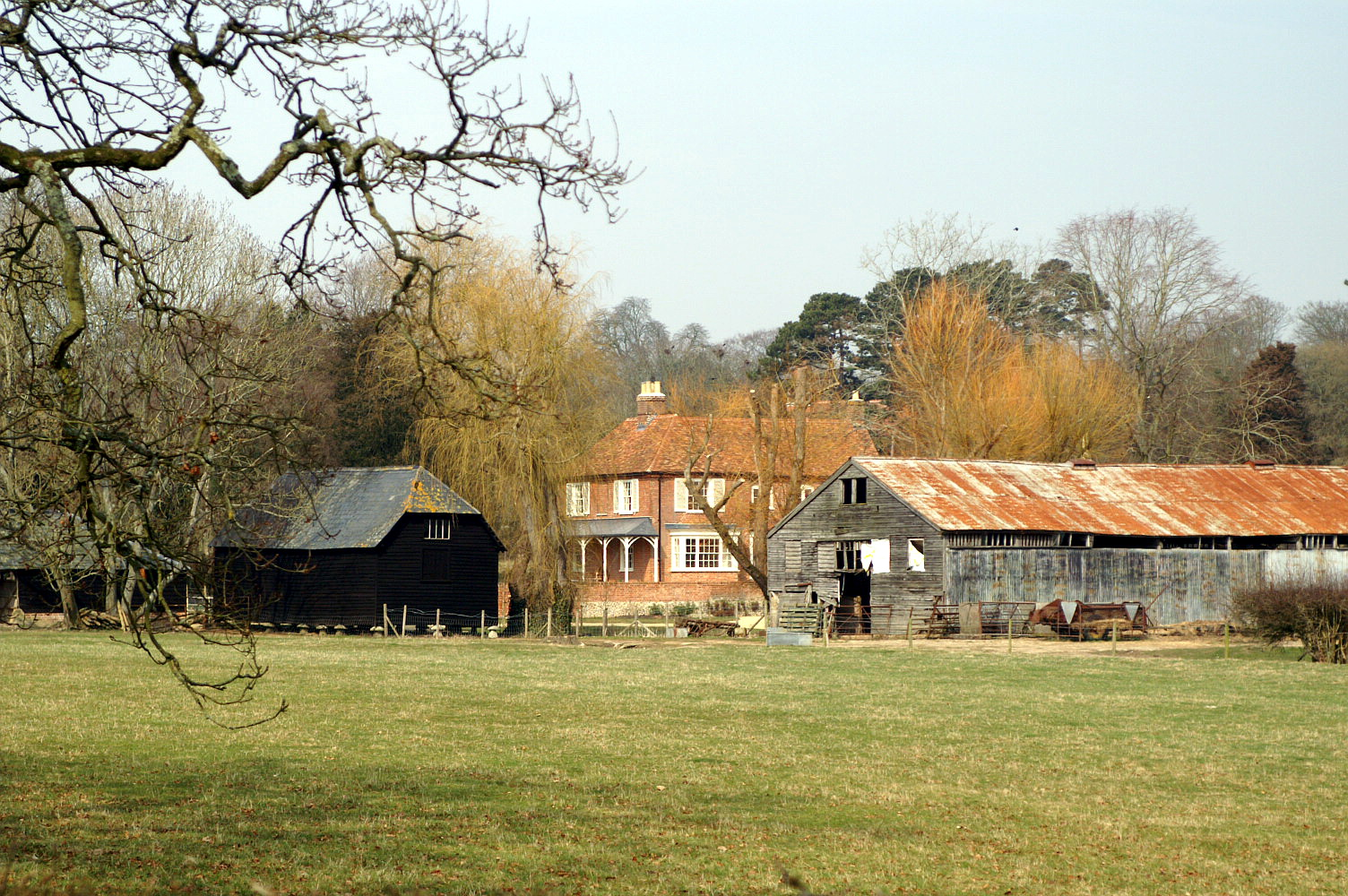

- Location within Hampshire
- Population: 643; 684 (2011 Census)
- OS grid reference: SU3725
- Civil parish: Braishfield
- District: Test Valley
- Shire county: Hampshire
- Region: South East
- Country: England
- Sovereign state: United Kingdom
- Post town: Romsey
- Postcode district: SO51
- Dialling code: 01794
- Police: Hampshire and Isle of Wight
- Fire: Hampshire and Isle of Wight
- Ambulance: South Central
- UK Parliament: Romsey and Southampton North

Braishfield is a village and civil parish north of Romsey in Hampshire, England. The name is thought to be derived from the Old English bræsc + feld, meaning 'open land with small branches or brushwood'. The hamlet of Pucknall lies due east of the village.

== Geology ==
The parish lies on the northern edge of the Hampshire Basin, with chalk in the north. To the south and east of the village this is overlain by Palaeocene sands and clays of the Lambeth Group. At the southern edge the Sir Harold Hillier Gardens are on younger deposits of Eocene age, sloping from a ridge of the Nursling sands into a valley of London Clay.

== History ==
Archaeological discoveries in Braishfield include the remains of some of the oldest dwellings to be found in Great Britain and the first Neolithic dwelling site of any kind to be discovered in Hampshire.

Higgins James Bown of Laurel Cottage, was the village wheelwright, carpenter, chairmaker and undertaker. H.J. Bown died in July 1954 aged 88 years. His woodworking tools were donated to the Museum of English Rural Life.

== Places of interest ==
The Church of England parish church of All Saints was built in 1855 to a design by William Butterfield.

== Transport ==
The Village has neither main roads nor railways, but is crossed by the Monarch's Way long-distance footpath.

== Sport ==
Braishfield has a long running football club who play their home games at the Recreation Ground. Founded in 1907, Braishfield F.C. run two adult sides in the Southampton League, whilst the Braishfield Bees have numerous teams at various age groups playing in the Test Way Youth League.

There is also a village cricket club, who are known as the Newport Inn after the pub.

Braishfield is well known for Ultimate frisbee, having one of the longest running Ultimate frisbee Clubs in the UK. They have played every Sunday since founding in 1998. On July 11th 2026 they won Open Tour 3, the highest level of Ultimate in the UK, defeating Birmingham and Bristol en route to the final, before emerging victorious against the heavy favourites Manchester Ultimate with a 10-8 victory.

== Local folklore and legend ==
Braishfield is reputedly haunted.

== Media appearances ==
Much of the 1979-1981 television series Worzel Gummidge was filmed in and around Braishfield.

== Twin towns ==
Braishfield is twinned with:

- Crouay, France
