= Timsbury, Hampshire =

Village and parish in Hampshire, England

Coordinates: 51.019875°N 1.505549°W

Timsbury
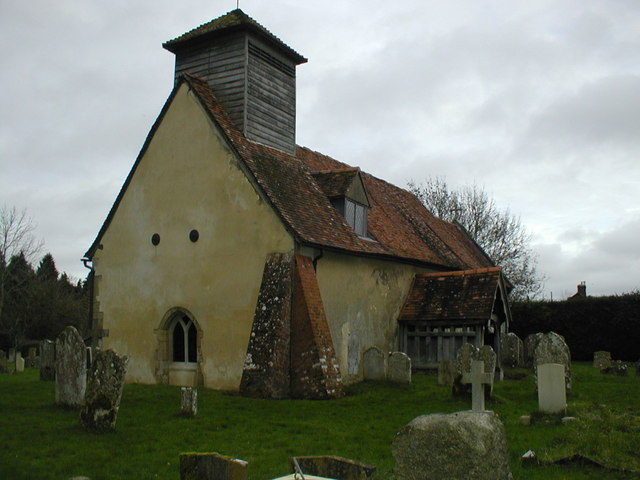

- Location within Hampshire
- Population: 400
- Civil parish: Michelmersh and Timsbury
- District: Test Valley
- Shire county: Hampshire
- Region: South East
- Country: England
- Sovereign state: United Kingdom
- Post town: Romsey
- Postcode district: SO51
- Dialling code: 01794
- Police: Hampshire and Isle of Wight
- Fire: Hampshire and Isle of Wight
- Ambulance: South Central
- UK Parliament: Romsey and Southampton North

Timsbury is a village and former civil parish, now in the parish of Michelmersh and Timsbury, in the Test Valley district, in Hampshire, England. It is near the town of Romsey, mainly along the A3057 road running north from Romsey towards Stockbridge, and shares a boundary with the village of Michelmersh.

It has a population of approximately 400.

== History ==
The name "Timsbury" is derived from the Old English timber + byrig (dative of burh), meaning 'timber fort or manor'.

Timsbury has grown from a traditional village centred on the Manor House (now split into many dwellings) and the Church of St Andrew. Although there may have been a Saxon church, the current Grade II listed building dates from around the early 15th century and was badly damaged by fire on 9 March 2014.

Historically, Edmund Sharp and his wife Alice moved from the county of Berkshire to Timsbury towards the end of the seventeenth century. A direct descendant of Edmund Sharp was Richard Sharp, once hailed as possibly being the most popular man in Georgian London.

An interesting anecdote has survived concerning one of Edmund's sons, Richard, who, born in 1665 gained a reputation as an accomplished wrestler and ‘cudgeller’ in the area. Even in those days cudgelling was a very old custom and especially popular in the West of England where great pride was attached to skills which were often handed from father to son. It was a fast and furious activity conducted brutally using a short club and the expression ‘to break a head’ was associated with the cudgeller's sport since the victor was he who first drew blood from a gash to the head.

The story recorded by his grandson and clearly cherished by later generations underlines the extent of Richard's physical prowess,

While he lived at Romsey he of a summer’s day rode up to Timsbury, where he lived, where he had been brought up and where when young he had been so fond of wrestling. It so happened that a stage was erected and sitting on his horse he stayed long enough to see a man throw two or three men who had mounted the stage against him, till all were intimidated from entering the list; the conqueror …. triumphed on the stage with so much arrogance that my grandfather was tempted to humble him; therefore he got off his horse, mounted the stage, threw the boaster on his back and having humbled the boaster he immediately took horse and left them.

In time the Sharp family became well established in the Romsey area and during the 18th and 19th centuries many of them held important positions as merchants or influential citizens of Romsey. A brass floor plate in Romsey Abbey commemorates many of them.

Cartoonist Norman Thelwell made his home in the village, in a remodeled farmhouse with a trout pond, described in his 1978 book A Plank Bridge by a Pool.

== Village life ==
In modern Timsbury, the local amenities include a garden centre with cafe, a pub called "The Malthouse", a car sales garage, a fishery, St Andrew's Church of England church, a Jehovah Witness's Kingdom Hall, a recycling site, the Hunts Farm Sports Ground, and a pre-school. The ladies of Timsbury were bequeathed a hall which was used by the Women's Institute (WI), however, following a decline in local WI membership the hall was sold to the village band.

The British Olympic athletics team trained at Timsbury Manor before the 1964 Olympics in September 1964

Many local facilities are shared within the civil parish of Michelmersh and Timsbury due to their close proximity, including the Jubilee (village) Hall and the sports pavilion. The villages share a common village design statement to guide development in the area.

The local telephone exchange is located in nearby Braishfield, with most telephone numbers in the village 01794 368XXX.

The parish publishes a bi-monthly newsletter distributed free to households in the parish.

== Civil parish ==
In 1931 the parish had a population of 257. On 1 April 1932 the parish was abolished and merged with Michelmersh.

== Nearby ==
Adjacent villages include Awbridge, Kimbridge, Mottisfont, Mottisfont & Dunbridge railway station, Lockerley, Houghton, Hampshire, Horsebridge railway station, Kings Sombourne, Braishfield, Hursley, Ampfield,
