= Raymond McEnhill Stadium =

Sporting facility in Wiltshire, England

Coordinates: 51°06′15.62″N 1°47′08.73″W

The Raymond McEnhill Stadium
- The Ray Mac
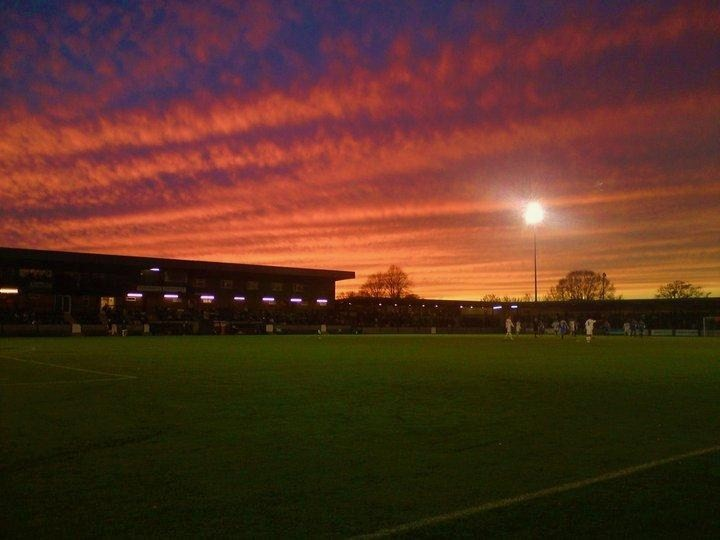
- Interactive map of The Raymond McEnhill Stadium
- Location: Partridge Way, Old Sarum, near Salisbury; SP4 6PU
- Capacity: 4,000 (official); 5,000 (total)
- Surface: Grass

Construction
- Opened: 1997

Tenants
- Salisbury City F.C. (1997–2014); Salisbury F.C. (2015–); Salisbury F.C. Women (2022–)

The Raymond McEnhill Stadium is a purpose-built 5,000 capacity football stadium in Salisbury, Wiltshire, England. It is the home of Salisbury Football Club and Salisbury F.C. Women.

== History ==
In 1997, Salisbury City moved to the stadium which was built at Old Sarum and was named after the then chairman, Raymond McEnhill. The stadium capacity is officially 4,000, although it is technically able to hold 5,000 with covered accommodation for 2,247 fans. The stadium has achieved the ground 'B' grade standard.

A then record crowd of 2,570 saw the FA Cup first round 2–0 defeat by Hull City in 1998. This figure was beaten twice in the 2006–07 FA Cup. On 11 November 2006 a crowd of 2,684 saw Salisbury beat Fleetwood Town 3–0 in the first round proper. Then in the second round proper a crowd of 3,100 saw Salisbury draw 1–1 with Football League One club, Nottingham Forest.

The record league attendance at the stadium was set on 28 December 2009 when a crowd of 2,677 saw Salisbury draw 1–1 with Oxford United in a Conference Premier match.

On 12 May 2013, a new record attendance at the stadium was set when 3,408 spectators turned up to watch Salisbury beat Dover Athletic 3–2 in the Conference South play-off final. This win earned them promotion back to the Conference Premier, after two seasons in the Conference South.

With Salisbury City F.C. folding in 2014 following a failure to pay debts, a new phoenix club Salisbury F.C. took over the lease at the stadium in early 2015, after overcoming a proposal by the estate of Raymond McEnhill to sell the land for development. The record attendance for the stadium was superseded by the new club on 19 March 2016, when a crowd of 3,450 saw Salisbury lose 2–1 to Hereford in the semi-final of the FA Vase competition.

On 7th November 2026, the stadium record attendance was broken again in the FA Cup 1st round proper against Sholing.

On 23 October 2022, the stadium became the home of Salisbury F.C. Women.
