= Totton & Eling F.C. =

Association football club in Totton & Eling, England

Coordinates: 50°54′56″N 1°30′00″W

Totton & Eling
- Full name: Totton & Eling Football Club
- Nickname: The Millers
- Founded: 1925 (as Bramtoco)
- Ground: Miller Park, Little Testwood Farm, Totton
- Capacity: 1,500
- Chairman: Andy Tipp
- Manager: Jake Hallett
- League: Wessex League Division One
- 2025–26: Wessex League Division One, 20th of 22
Home colours	Away colours

Totton & Eling Football Club are a football club based in Totton & Eling, Hampshire, England. The club is affiliated to the Hampshire Football Association, and is a FA Charter Standard club. The club competes in the Wessex League Division One.

== History ==
The club was formed in 1925 as Bramtoco FC from the workforce of the British American Tobacco Company and played in the Southampton League. In 1971 they changed name to BAT Sports, the same year as they entered the Hampshire League. They progressed through the Leagues, winning Division Two in 1975 and being Champions of Division One in both 1988 and 1989. At that time the installation of floodlights, the construction of a small stand and a permanent fixed barrier enabled them to join the Wessex League. An additional stand and covered standing area followed in due course.

Since joining the League they have twice reached the 3rd Round of the FA Vase, on the second occasion being drawn against AFC Wimbledon. With the weather causing the BAT ground to be unfit the tie was switched to South West London drawing an attendance of nearly 3,000. Due to the imminent loss of their long serving Southern Gardens home, they were forced to drop down a division at the end of the 2006–07 season and continued with their reserve side in Wessex League Division 2 at the end of that season and because of a restructuring in the leagues and still having their ground with a new one promised by Linden Homes they were put in Division 1 and changed their name to Totton & Eling Football Club. They worked hard in getting a side that would compete and were eventually rewarded in 2009 winning the 1st Division easily with over 100 points and goals regaining Wessex Premier Football again.

The following year the club moved to the present ground at Miller Park at Little Testwood Farm which is adjacent to AFC Totton. They stayed in the Premier division until 2015 when, due to a lack of funds and a clubhouse and a real lack of people to help, the club got relegated to Division 1. After a great fight back right till the end of the season which saw the club narrowly relegated on the last day of last season. The club currently has the following teams: U9, x2 U14, U15 (Girls), x2 U18, Reserve side & 1st Team and still growing every year.

== Ground ==
Totton & Eling play their home games at Miller Park, Little Testwood Farm, Totton, Southampton, SO40 2RW.

== Club Honours ==
- Wessex League Division 1
  - 2008–09
- Hampshire League Division 1
  - 1987–88, 1998–99
- Hampshire League Division 3
  - 1974–75
- Southampton League Premier Division
  - 1970-71
- Hampshire Intermediate Cup
  - 1937–38
- Hampshire Russell Cotes Cup
  - 1989–90, 2009–10
- Southampton Senior Cup
  - 1975–76, 1988–89

== FA competitions best performances ==
- FA Cup: 1st Qualifying Round – 1998–99, 2001–02, 2002–03, 2004–05, 2012–13
- FA Vase: 3rd Round – 1999–2000, 2003–04
