= Braishfield F.C. =

Association football club in England

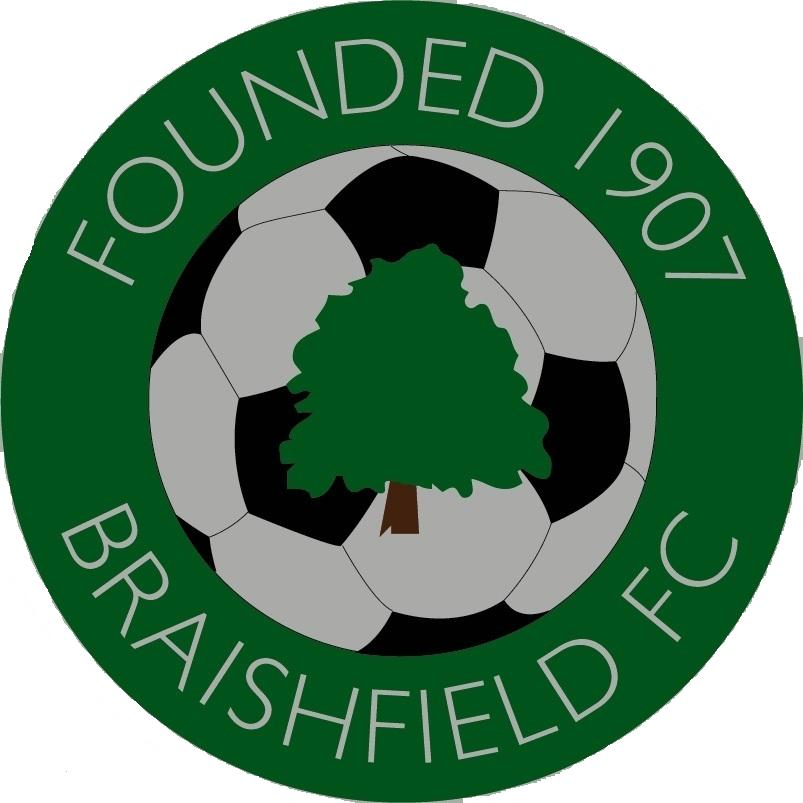
- Full name: Braishfield Football Club
- Founded: 1907
- Ground: Braishfield Recreation Ground
- Chairman: Kevin Hitchcock
- Manager: Dan Edwards
- League: Southampton League Premier Division
- Website: https://pitchero.com/clubs/braishfieldfootballclub
Home colours	Away colours

Braishfield F.C. is an amateur football club based in Braishfield, a village and civil parish about two miles northeast of Romsey in the Test Valley district of Hampshire, England.

The club is affiliated with the Hampshire Football Association and are long serving members of the Southampton League.

== History ==
Braishfield were formed in 1907 and spent their early years playing friendlies against various local opponents. The first known match ended in a 4–4 draw with Ampfield in November 1907.

After World War I, the club became more organised and began using the village recreation ground for home fixtures. In 1923, they became founding members of the short-lived Ampfield & District League before progressing to the larger Southampton League. After World War II, they returned to the competition in 1948 and, apart from a five-year period playing in the Eastleigh & District League from 1955–60, they have remained members ever since.

It was not until the formation of a successful Sunday side in the early 1970's that Braishfield won their first piece of silverware. When interest faded, attention shifted back to the Saturday team, which began rapidly climbing through the Junior divisions. By 1980, the club had gained Senior status for the first time and formed a reserve side. Two further promotions saw them reach the Premier Division in 1985, where they finished as runners-up and made a successful application to join the Hampshire League.

Operating on limited resources, Braishfield solidified their position in Division 2 during a period that included several historically successful clubs. The team also reached the latter stages of multiple cup competitions. In 1992, they reached the Southampton Senior Cup final, losing 0–2 to Aerostructures at The Dell, Southampton. However, a player exodus two years later saw them relegated, after losing almost every game.

Hampshire League record 1986-2000

Season	Division	Position	Pld	W	D	L	F	A	Pts	Notes
1986/87	Two	8/18	32	10	11	11	46	49	31	2 points for a win
1987/88	Two	13/19	36	13	4	19	48	65	30	Southampton Senior Cup semi-finalists
1988/89	Two	8/19	36	14	9	13	50	63	37	
1989/90	Two	10/18	34	13	7	14	46	51	46	3 points for a win
1990/91	Two	9/18	34	14	11	9	42	38	53	
1991/92	Two	8/15	28	10	6	12	42	49	36	Southampton Senior Cup finalists
1992/93	Two	14/18	34	10	5	19	39	61	35	Hampshire Intermediate Cup semi-finalists
1993/94	Two	17/17	32	1	1	30	15	177	4	Relegated
1994/95	Three	15/18	34	8	8	18	51	76	32	
1995/96	Three	15/18	34	7	13	14	40	61	34	
1996/97	Three	14/20	38	12	8	18	43	65	44	
1997/98	Three	14/16	30	5	5	20	45	117	20	
1998/99	Three	10/19	34	12	7	15	48	53	43	League re-organisation
1999/00	Two	13/14	24	3	4	17	22	68	13	Relegated

In 2000, Braishfield were relegated back to the Southampton League, and by the time they celebrated their centenary in 2007, they had dropped back into the Junior section. The club’s survival during this period was largely due to the efforts of a small and loyal committee.

Following the opening of a much-needed new pavilion, the club won the Junior Division 2 title in 2014. This resulted in a 'double promotion' to Senior Division 1, where they enjoyed another strong season. Although Braishfield narrowly missed out on a second consecutive title, they caused a major upset by winning the Senior League Cup, defeating higher division BTC Southampton in a dramatic final at Eastleigh FC.

Initially, Braishfield struggled upon their return to the top flight and were relegated in 2018. However, they bounced back at the first attempt and have since become well-established at that level. They have reached the Senior League Cup final twice more (both held at AFC Totton), though were convincingly beaten on both occasions.

== Honours ==
=== 1st Team ===
- Southampton Football Association
  - Senior Cup Finalists: 1991/92
  - Charity Cup Finalists: 1986
- Southampton League
  - Premier Division Runners-up: 1985/86
  - Senior Division 1 Runners-up: 2014/15 and 2018/19
  - Senior Division 2 Runners-up: 1980/81
  - Junior Division 2 Champions: 2013/14; Runners-up: 1978/79
  - Junior Division 3 Runners-up: 1977/78
  - Junior Division 4 Runners-up: 1976/77
  - Junior Division 5 Runners-up: 1965/66
  - Junior Division 8 Runners-up: 1960/61
  - Senior League Cup Winners: 2014/15; Finalists: 2022/23 and 2023/24
  - Supplementary Trophy Finalists: 2015/16

=== 2nd Team ===
- Southampton League
  - Junior Division 2 Runners-up: 2018/19
  - Junior Division 8 Champions: 1979/80
  - Junior League Trophy Winners: 2003/04

== Ground ==
Braishfield Football Club plays at the Recreation Ground, Braishfield Road, Braishfield, SO51 0PN.

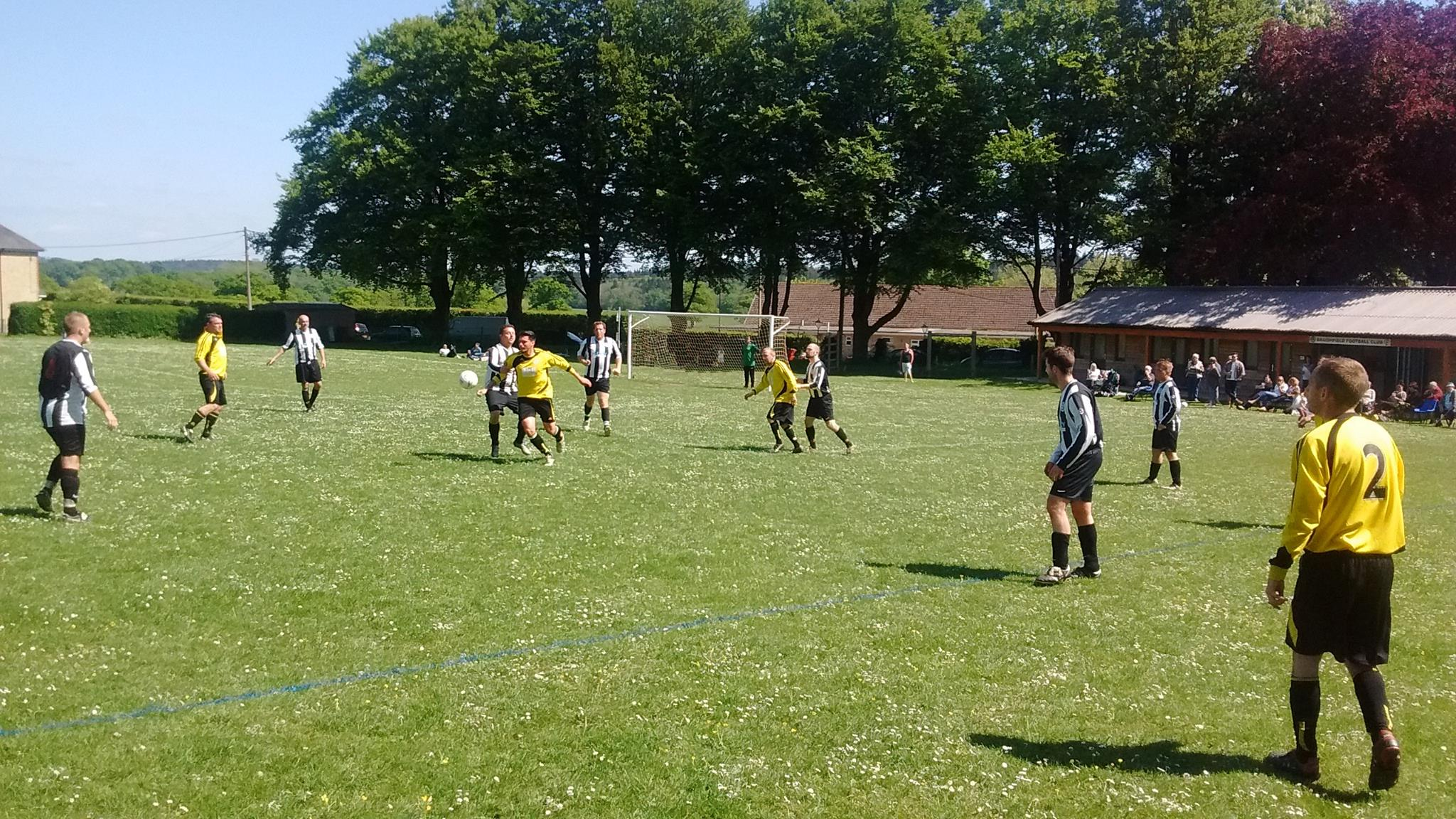
Braishfield Recreation Ground

They have done so since 1922, after local resident Mrs. King donated the land to the village. The record attendance is believed to be around 300 in August 1983 when the club played an Ex-Southampton XI in a fundraising fixture.

The pavilion is located the lower (school) end of the field, with the new, modern-day pavilion officially opened by Lawrie McMenemy in July 2013. The building features a covered area for spectators and a large function room with a licensed bar.

The venue has a large car park at the upper end, adjacent to the Village Hall and Pantry.

== Notable players ==
Throughout its history, Braishfield has had many notable players, most famously Dave Old, who dedicated over 60 years of service to the club on and off the pitch.

The former Southampton skipper Peter Rodrigues played for the club during the 1983/84 campaign, whilst village resident John Mortimore was a regular supporter at home matches.

== Local rivalries ==
Braishfield has a longstanding rivalry with Test Valley neighbours Romsey Town, Mottisfont and Michelmersh & Timsbury, whom they now frequently face in the Southampton League. Other rivalries have faded due to the broader decline in grassroots football.

== Print ==
- The Official History of Braishfield Football Club 1907-2024 - by Lee Whitelock
