= Bishop's Waltham Town F.C. =

English football club

- Full name: Bishop's Waltham Town Football Club
- Founded: 1901
- Dissolved: 2013
- Ground: Priory Park or Hoe Lane, Bishop's Waltham
Home colours	Away colours

Bishop's Waltham Town F.C. were a long running amateur football club based in Bishop's Waltham, a town in the Meon Valley area of Hampshire.

== History ==
Bishop's Waltham Town F.C. were originally established in 1901 and initially played friendly matches.

In 1920 they became founder members of the Meon Valley League before progressing to the Southampton League, where they held membership for many years.

In 1983/84 they won promotion to the Premier Division for the first time, and two years later they won the title for what was their first serious piece of silverware. The club were then elected to the Hampshire League Division 2, where they finished 3rd to win promotion to Division 1. Bishop's Waltham then enjoyed success in 1992 when they beat Whitchurch United 3–1 to win the inaugural League Cup, and in 1993 when they were league runners-up to Pirelli General. Fortunes declined after this, and by 1997 they were in Division 3 - but in 1999 the league was re-structured with the top-flight being renamed as the Premier Division (for clubs with fixed barriers and floodlights) and after making these requirements at Priory Park, Bishop's Waltham were included.

In 2004 the original Hampshire League was absorbed by the expanded Wessex League, with the new set-up having three divisions. Bishop's Waltham were placed in the middle tier, but in 2006 they were relegated. They continued to struggle, and had to pull out midway through the following season.

The club regrouped and when the Wessex League was reduced to two divisions in 2007, the new Hampshire Premier League was subsequently formed with Bishop's Waltham Town becoming founder members, along with Sporting BTC. After both teams finished midtable, they then joined forces and become known as Sporting Bishop's Waltham.

The club continued on in a midtable position but despite the merger, they found success hard to come by. In bid to attract more local support they changed their name back to Bishop's Waltham Town for the 2013/14 season, but after a difficult start and loss of key personnel, they withdrew from the league and folded.

== Honours ==
=== 1st Team ===
- Hampshire League
  - League Cup Winners 1991/92
  - Division 1 Runners-up 1992/93
- Southampton League
  - Premier Division Champions 1985/86
- Meon Valley League
  - Division 1 Champions 1921/22 and 1922/23
  - Pink Cup Winners 1921/22, 1922/23 and 1923/24

=== 2nd Team ===
- Southampton League
  - Senior Division 2 Champions 1989/90
- Southampton Football Association
  - Junior 'A' Cup Winners 1987/88
  - Junior 'B' Cup Winners 1976/77 and 2006/07

== County League record ==
Season	Division	Position	Significant events
1986/87	Hampshire League Division 2	3/18	Promoted
1987/88	Hampshire League Division 1	15/18	
1988/89	Hampshire League Division 1	13/17	
1989/90	Hampshire League Division 1	14/18	
1990/91	Hampshire League Division 1	5/18	
1991/92	Hampshire League Division 1	12/18	
1992/93	Hampshire League Division 1	2/17	Runners-up
1993/94	Hampshire League Division 1	6/20	
1994/95	Hampshire League Division 1	20/20	Relegated
1995/96	Hampshire League Division 2	8/18	
1996/97	Hampshire League Division 2	17/18	Relegated
1997/98	Hampshire League Division 3	7/16	
1998/99	Hampshire League Division 3	9/19	Re-organisation
1999/00	Hampshire League Premier Division	15/22	
2000/01	Hampshire League Premier Division	19/21	
2001/02	Hampshire League Premier Division	17/21	
2002/03	Hampshire League Premier Division	14/20	
2003/04	Hampshire League Premier Division	11/18	Competition absorbed by Wessex League
2004/05	Wessex League Division 1	20/22	
2005/06	Wessex League Division 1	21/22	Relegated
2006/07	Wessex League Division 2	17/18	Withdrew, record expunged
2007/08	Hampshire Premier League	15/17	
2008/09	Hampshire Premier League	16/18	Merged with Sporting BTC
2009/10	Hampshire Premier League	16/18	
2010/11	Hampshire Premier League	14/18	
2011/12	Hampshire Premier League	14/17	
2012/13	Hampshire Premier League	12/18	
2013/14	Hampshire Premier League	18/18	Withdrew, record expunged

== Ground ==
Bishops Waltham Town F.C. frequently alternated between Priory Park, Elizabeth Way, Bishops Waltham, SO32 1SQ and Hoe Lane Recreation Ground, Bishop's Waltham, SO32 1DU for their home games. Both venues remain in use. Each with two pitches, one each with a fixed barrier, large changing rooms and ample parking for spectators.

== Notable players ==
Former Burnley, Southampton and Huddersfield Town midfielder Brian O'Neil played for Bishops Waltham during the eighties.

== Local rivalries ==
Bishop's Waltham Town enjoyed a healthy local rivalry with a number of clubs from within the Meon Valley area. Neighbours Swanmore were regarded at their main rivals.

== Successor club ==
Fortunately, it was not the end of football in the town. In 2012 long running youth club Bishop's Waltham Dynamoes (established in 1975) formed a senior side, which has since risen to prominence.

After climbing the Southampton League, they won the Premier Division title in 2023 and made a successful application to join the Hampshire Premier League. Bishops Waltham then won the League Cup in their debut season, beating Locks Heath 3-1 in the final played at AFC Totton.

The club, who run many teams at various age groups, are affiliated to the Hampshire Football Association and have been awarded charter status.
