= Southampton Football League =

Association football league in England

- Founded: 1908; 118 years ago
- Country: England
- Divisions: 6
- Number of clubs: 64
- Promotion to: Hampshire Premier League
- Current champions: Lyndhurst (2025/26)
- Most championships: Nursling (6)
- Website: https://www.soton-satfl.org.uk

The Southampton Football League is a long-running Saturday grassroots football league based in the port city Southampton and surrounding area of Hampshire on the south coast of England.

In existence since 1908, it is affiliated to the Hampshire Football Association with over 60 teams taking part across six divisions - the highest of which feeder to the Hampshire Premier League.

== History ==
The Southampton Football Association was founded in 1908 at a meeting attended by 40 people, including William Pickford. At this meeting, the league and cup competitions were established in the Senior and Junior format, and they remain in place today.

Since its founding, the League has grown in popularity with a vast number of works teams (mostly from the city docks), college old boys sides and village clubs taking part. While some of these persist in the present, others disappeared in earlier stages of the League's history.

Subject to ground requirements, champions of the top-flight have always been eligible to apply for promotion to the Hampshire League. Many clubs known well today began in the Southampton League, most notably Eastleigh, AFC Totton, Sholing, and AFC Stoneham, whilst the alumni list also includes nine other clubs who are now members of the Wessex League. A number of professional players also participated in the competition, either at a young age or later in their careers.

In 1963, the Premier Division was formed as an effort to raise standards and bridge the gap with the county league. During the 1960s and 1970s, the Southampton League reached its peak in popularity with a constitution that regularly consisted of over 160 teams, evenly spread across three Senior and up to ten Junior Divisions.

Member clubs have also performed well in external competitions, with a number of sides winning the Hampshire FA Intermediate and Junior Cups (now known as the Trophy and Vase). It is a similar story with the Southampton FA, although not since 1986 has a side won the prestigious Senior Cup.

Since 1993, the League has been run independently from the Southampton Football Association, and in 1999 it became one of the first in the country to introduce a Veterans section. The new millennium saw the introduction of domestic league cup competitions for each level.

With the expansion of leagues higher up the pyramid and the general decline in the grassroots game, the Southampton League has since been reduced in size. Nevertheless, in an attempt to maintain numbers, the League has expanded its boundary to accommodate clubs in the areas where leagues have been terminated.

Though Bush Hill holds the record for winning the Premier Division title five consecutive seasons from 2009 to 2013, it is their arch-rivals Nursling (formerly known as Nutfield United) who hold the record for the most overall titles, having won it on six occasions.

Since 2024, the Senior section now only consists of the Premier Division. Clubs who finish in the top two are eligible to apply to join the Hampshire Premier League. Depending on playing strength and facilities, players here can either go directly into the Senior Division (Step 7/Level 11 on the national pyramid system) or sideways to Division 1.

== Member clubs 2026–27 ==
=== Premier Division ===
- Braishfield
- Fleming Athletic
- Folland Sports 'A'
- Fordingbridge Turks
- Michelmersh & Timsbury
- Nursling & Shirley Reserves
- Select Generation
- Sherfield English
- Upham
- Waterlooville AFC

All teams are eligible to enter the Hampshire FA Trophy, Southampton FA Senior Cup and Senior League Cup.

=== Junior Division 1 ===
- Broughton Reserves
- BTC Southampton Reserves
- Chandlers Ford
- Clarendon
- Comrades
- Lyndhurst Reserves
- Pennington S&S
- AFC Stoneham Veterans
- Woolston Wanderers
- Wyvern

=== Junior Division 2 ===
- Alderbury
- Bishopstoke
- BTC Southampton 'A'
- Comrades Reserves
- Dynamo Dockside
- Fawley RBL
- Redlynch & Woodfalls United
- St Francis
- Sarisbury Sparks
- Sporting Wessex Reserves
- AFC Station
- Wickham Dynamoes

=== Junior Division 3 ===
- Braishfield Reserves
- BTC Southampton 'B'
- Chandlers Ford Reserves
- Fordingbridge Turks Reserves
- Redlynch & Woodfalls Utd Res
- St Francis Reserves
- Shield
- Sherfield English Reserves
- Southbrook Youth
- Waterside Wanderers

All teams are eligible to enter the Hampshire FA Vase, Southampton FA Junior Cup and Junior League Trophy or Vase.

=== Veterans 'A' Division ===
- AW Jeffreys
- Burridge
- Chandlers Ford
- Fleming Athletic
- Folland Sports
- Gosport
- Hedge End Rangers
- Hedge End Spartans
- Knighton Arms
- Michelmersh & Timsbury 'A'
- Solent Sports Merlins
- Solent Sports Millers Pond

=== Veterans 'B' Division ===
- BTC Southampton
- Durley
- Inmar
- Itchen Saints
- Michelmersh & Timsbury 'B'
- Redlynch & Woodfalls United
- Solent Sports Barbarians
- Solent Sports Commoners
- Wyvern Corinthians

All teams are eligible to enter Hampshire FA Veterans Cup, Southampton FA Veterans Cup and Veterans League Cup.

== Past & Present Clubs ==
- See Southampton League Clubs.

== Premier Division champions ==
Season	Champions
1963/64	Netley Central Sports Reserves
1964/65	Netley Central Sports Reserves
1965/66	Awbridge
1966/67	Awbridge
1967/68	Botley
1968/69	Redbridge Rovers
1969/70	Totton Athletic
1970/71	Bramtoco Sports
1971/72	Newlands
1972/73	Hedge End
1973/74	Southampton YMCA
1974/75	Testwood United
1975/76	Southampton YMCA
1976/77	Millbrook & Maybush
1977/78	N.D.L.B.
1978/79	Old Simmarians
1979/80	N.D.L.B.
1980/81	Romsey Town Reserves
1981/82	West End
1982/83	Romsey Town Reserves
1983/84	North Baddesley
1984/85	Folland Sports Reserves
1985/86	Bishops Waltham Town
1986/87	Otterbourne
1987/88	Nutfield United
1988/89	Nutfield United
1989/90	Old Tauntonians
1990/91	Hedge End
1991/92	Brendon
1992/93	Fair Oak
1993/94	Fair Oak
1994/95	Fair Oak
1995/96	West End
1996/97	Ordnance Survey
1997/98	Brendon
1998/99	BTC Southampton
1999/00	Brendon
2000/01	Brendon
2001/02	Brendon
2002/03	Nursling
2003/04	Sporting BTC
2004/05	Nursling
2005/06	Nursling
2006/07	Comrades
2007/08	Nursling
2008/09	Bush Hill
2009/10	Bush Hill
2010/11	Bush Hill
2011/12	Bush Hill
2012/13	Bush Hill
2013/14	Cadnam United
2014/15	BTC Southampton
2015/16	Comrades
2016/17	BTC Southampton
2017/18	Athletico Romsey
2018/19	Chamberlayne Athletic
2019/20	-
2020/21	Whiteley Wanderers
2021/22	Hedge End Town
2022/23	Bishops Waltham Dynamoes
2023/24	Crofton Saints
2024/25	AFC Shirley
2025/26	Lyndhurst
2026/27	?

== Senior League Cup finals ==
Season	Winner	Score	Runner-up	Venue
2001/02	Brendon	2-1	Sporting BTC	Stoneham
2002/03	Mottisfont	1-1 *	AFC Target	Stoneham
2003/04	Lyndhurst	1-0	Botley Village	Stoneham
2004/05	Nursling	4-2	AFC Bassett	Stoneham
2005/06	Bush Hill	1-0	Botley Village	Stoneham
2006/07	Bush Hill	4-3	Comrades	Stoneham
2007/08	Nursling	-	Burridge Sports	Stoneham
2008/09	Freemantle	1-1 *	Northend United	Eastleigh
2009/10	Spartans	5-2	Bush Hill	Eastleigh
2010/11	Netley Central Sports Reserves	-	Solent WTL	Eastleigh
2011/12	Lyndhurst	2-1	Cadnam United	Eastleigh
2012/13	Bush Hill	5-0	Park Sports	Eastleigh
2013/14	Comrades	4-1	Cadnam United	Eastleigh
2014/15	Braishfield	2-2 *	BTC Southampton	Eastleigh
2015/16	Comrades	2-1	BTC Southampton	Follands
2016/17	Chamberlayne Athletic	4-0	Nursling	Eastleigh
2017/18	Upham Reserves	0-0 *	Comrades	Totton
2018/19	Chamberlayne Athletic	1-0	Alderbury	Totton
2019/20	-	-	-	Abandoned
2020/21	-	-	-	Not held
2021/22	Hedge End Town	2-0	BTC Southampton	Eastleigh
2022/23	Hedge End Rangers	4–0	Braishfield	Totton
2023/24	Crofton Saints	3–0	Braishfield	Totton
2024/25	AFC Shirley	1–0	BTC Southampton	Totton
2025/26	Lyndhurst	5-2	Fordingbridge Turks	Totton
2026/27	?	–	?	Totton
	* = won on penalties			

== Print ==
- A Century of Southampton Local Soccer 1908–2008 by John Moody
- Southampton Football League Handbook & Directory (produced annually)
