= 2004–05 Wessex Football League =

Wessex Football League
- Season: 2004–05
- Champions: Lymington & New Milton

The 2004–05 Wessex Football League was the 19th season of the Wessex Football League, and the first in which the league consisted of three divisions, with two new sections being added. The league champions for the second time in their history were Lymington & New Milton, who were promoted to the Isthmian League. There was a full programme of promotion and relegation between the three divisions.

For sponsorship reasons, the league was known as the Sydenhams Wessex League.

== League tables ==
=== Division One ===
Division One consisted of 22 clubs, the same as the single division of the previous season, after Blackfield & Langley and Whitchurch United were relegated and two new clubs joined:

- Hamworthy United, joining from the Dorset Premier League.
- VT, joining from the Hampshire League.

Pos	Team	Pld	W	D	L	GF	GA	GD	Pts	Qualification or relegation
1	Lymington & New Milton (C, P)	42	31	6	5	123	41	+82	99	Joined the Isthmian League Division One
2	Winchester City	42	31	4	7	134	38	+96	97	
3	Thatcham Town	42	24	13	5	95	51	+44	85	
4	Gosport Borough	42	25	9	8	75	49	+26	84	
5	Andover	42	24	8	10	100	67	+33	80	
6	A.F.C. Newbury	42	23	8	11	80	45	+35	77	
7	Wimborne Town	42	20	12	10	82	53	+29	72	
8	A.F.C. Totton	42	19	10	13	69	59	+10	67	
9	B.A.T. Sports	42	17	12	13	63	60	+3	63	
10	Moneyfields	42	14	14	14	62	57	+5	56	
11	Bournemouth	42	16	8	18	54	65	−11	56	
12	VT	42	16	7	19	69	80	−11	55	
13	Cowes Sports	42	16	6	20	70	69	+1	54	
14	Bemerton Heath Harlequins	42	15	6	21	64	72	−8	51	
15	Hamworthy United	42	14	9	19	51	72	−21	51	
16	Fareham Town	42	13	9	20	50	63	−13	46 (Note: Fareham Town had two points deducted.)	
17	Christchurch	42	12	8	22	64	80	−16	44	
18	Brockenhurst	42	12	5	25	52	79	−27	41	
19	Alton Town	42	9	10	23	50	90	−40	37	
20	Portland United	42	8	6	28	35	104	−69	30	
21	Hamble A.S.S.C.	42	6	7	29	36	121	−85	25	
22	Downton (R)	42	7	3	32	50	113	−63	24	Relegated to Division Two

(C) Champions; (P) Promoted; (R) Relegated

=== Division Two ===
Division Two also consisted of 22 clubs, 17 of them joining from the Hampshire League Premier Division, plus:

- Alresford Town, joining from the Hampshire League Division One.
- Blackfield & Langley, relegated from the single division of the Wessex League of the previous season.
- Romsey Town, joining from the Hampshire League Division Two.
- Shaftesbury, joining from the Dorset Premier League.
- Whitchurch United, relegated from the single division of the Wessex League of the previous season.

Pos	Team	Pld	W	D	L	GF	GA	GD	Pts	Promotion or relegation
1	Lymington Town (C, P)	42	35	3	4	121	28	+93	108	Promoted to Division One
2	Poole Town (P)	42	33	4	5	123	29	+94	103	Promoted to Division One
3	Locks Heath	42	24	10	8	80	44	+36	82	
4	Romsey Town	42	23	8	11	84	55	+29	77	
5	Petersfield Town	42	21	10	11	77	49	+28	73	
6	Liss Athletic	42	21	8	13	106	77	+29	71	
7	Blackfield & Langley	42	20	9	13	90	62	+28	69	
8	Stockbridge	42	19	9	14	91	71	+20	66	
9	Horndean	42	18	12	12	85	76	+9	66	
10	Alresford Town	42	20	4	18	85	74	+11	64	
11	Ringwood Town	42	20	3	19	89	84	+5	63	
12	Whitchurch United	42	17	5	20	72	77	−5	56	
13	Shaftesbury	42	15	9	18	65	85	−20	54	
14	Hythe & Dibden	42	15	7	20	75	105	−30	52	
15	Amesbury Town	42	14	7	21	76	99	−23	49	
16	Brading Town	42	13	8	21	75	84	−9	47	
17	East Cowes Victoria Athletic	42	12	9	21	71	85	−14	45	
18	Andover New Street	42	12	6	24	45	100	−55	42	
19	United Services Portsmouth	42	9	6	27	58	103	−45	33	
20	Bishop's Waltham Town	42	7	12	23	46	104	−58	33	
21	Fawley	42	9	4	29	54	111	−57	31	
22	A.F.C. Aldermaston (R)	42	7	3	32	50	116	−66	24	Relegated to Division Three

(C) Champions; (P) Promoted; (R) Relegated

=== Division Three ===
Division Three also consisted of 22 clubs, 13 of them joining from the Hampshire League Division One, and nine from Division Two – they were David Coleman AFC, Hamble Club, Ludgershall Sports, Netley Central Sports, Ordnance Survey, Otterbourne, QK Southampton, RS Basingstoke and Yateley Green.

Pos	Team	Pld	W	D	L	GF	GA	GD	Pts	Promotion or relegation
1	Colden Common (C)	38	28	4	6	123	39	+84	88	
2	Hayling United (P)	38	26	8	4	104	30	+74	86	Promoted to Division One
3	Farnborough North End (P)	38	26	7	5	111	38	+73	85	Promoted to Division One
4	Fleetlands	38	23	6	9	115	42	+73	75	
5	Paulsgrove	38	22	7	9	93	46	+47	73	
6	Otterbourne	38	23	3	12	88	36	+52	72	
7	Overton United	38	22	6	10	88	52	+36	72	
8	Tadley Calleva	38	21	7	10	84	43	+41	69 (Note: Tadley Calleva had one point deducted.)	
9	Micheldever	38	18	11	9	82	49	+33	65	
10	Clanfield	38	16	12	10	72	70	+2	60	
11	Laverstock & Ford	38	14	10	14	73	59	+14	52	
12	Netley Central Sports	38	13	7	18	71	66	+5	46	
13	Ordnance Survey	38	11	9	18	44	55	−11	42	
14	A.F.C. Portchester	38	11	6	21	65	83	−18	39	
15	Hamble Club	38	9	11	18	51	86	−35	38	
16	Verwood Town	38	8	6	24	54	95	−41	30	
17	Fleet Spurs	38	6	11	21	59	98	−39	29	
18	Ludgershall Sports	38	7	3	28	48	118	−70	24	Left at the end of the season
19	QK Southampton	38	4	4	30	41	178	−137	16	
20	Yateley Green	38	2	2	34	30	213	−183	8	Left at the end of the season
21	RS Basingstoke	0	0	0	0	0	0	0	0	Resigned after 21 matches, record expunged
22	David Coleman AFC	0	0	0	0	0	0	0	0	Resigned after 7 matches, record expunged

(C) Champions; (P) Promoted
