= 2005–06 Wessex Football League =

Wessex Football League
- Season: 2005–06
- Champions: Winchester City

The 2005–06 Wessex Football League was the 20th season of the Wessex Football League. The league champions for the second time in their history were Winchester City, who were promoted to the Southern League along with runners-up Thatcham Town and third-placed Andover. The extra promotions were because of the pyramid reorganisations that took place in 2006.

There was a full programme of promotion and relegation between the three Wessex League divisions. Promotion from the lower divisions was largely based on ground grading, rather than league finishing positions. This was protested by Division Two champions Locks Heath and Division Three champions Paulsgrove, but the league stuck with their decision to promote lower-placed clubs with better facilities.

For sponsorship reasons, the league was known as the Sydenhams Wessex League.

== League tables ==
=== Division One ===
Division One consisted of 22 clubs, the same as the previous season, after Lymington & New Milton were promoted to the Isthmian League, Downton were relegated and two new clubs joined:

- Lymington Town, champions of Division Two.
- Poole Town, runners-up in Division Two.

Pos	Team	Pld	W	D	L	GF	GA	GD	Pts	Qualification
1	Winchester City (C, P)	42	34	5	3	112	31	+81	107	Joined the Southern League
2	Thatcham Town (P)	42	29	7	6	92	37	+55	94	Joined the Southern League
3	Andover (P)	42	27	5	10	120	64	+56	86	Joined the Southern League
4	A.F.C. Totton	42	25	9	8	101	40	+61	84	
5	Gosport Borough	42	23	10	9	85	44	+41	79	
6	Hamworthy United	42	21	12	9	65	40	+25	75	
7	Bournemouth	42	21	10	11	72	45	+27	73	
8	Poole Town	42	21	8	13	79	60	+19	71	
9	Fareham Town	42	19	10	13	74	61	+13	67	
10	Christchurch	42	17	9	16	72	62	+10	60	
11	Moneyfields	42	14	16	12	48	49	−1	58	
12	Wimborne Town	42	15	10	17	60	61	−1	55	
13	VT	42	13	15	14	65	66	−1	54	
14	Bemerton Heath Harlequins	42	14	8	20	70	86	−16	50	
15	Hamble A.S.S.C.	42	14	7	21	50	56	−6	49	
16	Cowes Sports	42	12	10	20	48	67	−19	46	
17	Lymington Town	42	10	14	18	42	71	−29	44	
18	B.A.T. Sports	42	10	6	26	61	109	−48	36	Demoted to Division Three due to ground problems
19	A.F.C. Newbury	42	9	8	25	35	96	−61	35	Demoted to Division Three due to ground problems
20	Alton Town	42	8	9	25	51	99	−48	33	
21	Brockenhurst	42	4	6	32	42	93	−51	18	
22	Portland United (R)	42	2	6	34	32	139	−107	12	Demotion to the Dorset Premier League

(C) Champions; (P) Promoted; (R) Relegated

=== Division Two ===
Division Two also consisted of 22 clubs, the same as the previous season, after Lymington Town and Poole Town were promoted to Division One, A.F.C. Aldermaston were relegated to Division Three, and three new clubs joined:

- Downton, relegated from Division One.
- Farnborough North End, third-placed club in Division Three.
- Hayling United, runners-up in Division Three.

Pos	Team	Pld	W	D	L	GF	GA	GD	Pts	Promotion or relegation
1	Locks Heath (C)	42	31	5	6	96	28	+68	98	
2	Hayling United	42	27	8	7	99	39	+60	89	
3	Brading Town (P)	42	27	7	8	96	50	+46	88	Promoted to Division One
4	Downton (P)	42	27	6	9	108	64	+44	87	Promoted to Division One
5	Liss Athletic	42	26	5	11	99	57	+42	83	
6	Horndean (P)	42	22	6	14	95	67	+28	72	Promoted to Division One
7	Fawley	42	20	9	13	76	53	+23	69	
8	Stockbridge	42	18	13	11	82	52	+30	67	
9	Ringwood Town (P)	42	20	6	16	81	71	+10	66	Promoted to Division One
10	United Services Portsmouth	42	18	11	13	86	72	+14	65	
11	Farnborough North End	42	19	6	17	93	76	+17	63	
12	East Cowes Victoria Athletic	42	16	10	16	76	70	+6	58	
13	Romsey Town	42	15	11	16	59	61	−2	56	
14	Blackfield & Langley	42	14	13	15	81	69	+12	55	
15	Petersfield Town	42	12	8	22	58	91	−33	44	
16	Shaftesbury	40	10	10	20	53	96	−43	40	
17	Hythe & Dibden	42	11	7	24	50	98	−48	40	
18	Andover New Street	42	10	9	23	61	96	−35	39	
19	Amesbury Town	42	10	4	28	55	109	−54	34	
20	Alresford Town	42	8	9	25	49	86	−37	33	
21	Bishop's Waltham Town (R)	42	7	7	28	57	112	−55	28	Relegated to Division Three
22	Whitchurch United (R)	42	5	8	29	44	137	−93	23	Relegated to Division Three

(C) Champions; (P) Promoted; (R) Relegated

=== Division Three ===
Division Three consisted of 17 clubs, reduced from 22 the previous season, after DC, Ludgershall Sports, RS Basingstoke and Yateley Green left the league, and Hayling United and Farnborough North End were promoted to Division Two. One new club joined:

- A.F.C. Aldermaston, relegated from Division Two.

Pos	Team	Pld	W	D	L	GF	GA	GD	Pts	Promotion or relegation
1	Paulsgrove (C)	30	20	6	4	91	34	+57	66	
2	Laverstock & Ford (P)	30	19	6	5	62	37	+25	63	Promoted to Division One
3	Verwood Town (P)	30	19	3	8	73	42	+31	60	Promoted to Division One
4	Colden Common	30	17	5	8	86	45	+41	56	
5	Netley Central Sports	30	16	5	9	62	41	+21	53	Left the league at the end of the season
6	Fleetlands	30	15	7	8	59	36	+23	52	
7	Tadley Calleva	30	16	4	10	52	40	+12	52	
8	Otterbourne	30	14	6	10	56	45	+11	48	
9	A.F.C. Aldermaston	30	12	5	13	64	68	−4	41	
10	Overton United	30	11	7	12	54	53	+1	40	
11	A.F.C. Portchester	30	11	4	15	57	61	−4	37	
12	Ordnance Survey	30	10	6	14	69	68	+1	36	
13	Clanfield	30	11	3	16	56	62	−6	36	
14	Fleet Spurs	30	8	3	19	60	75	−15	27	
15	QK Southampton	30	2	3	25	24	123	−99	9	
16	Hamble Club	30	1	3	26	17	112	−95	6	
17	Micheldever	0	0	0	0	0	0	0	0	Resigned, record expunged

(C) Champions; (P) Promoted
