= 2006–07 Wessex Football League =

Wessex Football League
- Season: 2006–07
- Champions: Gosport Borough

The 2006–07 Wessex Football League was the 21st season of the Wessex Football League. The league champions for the first time in their history were Gosport Borough, who were promoted to the Southern League. The three divisions were renamed Premier Division, Division One and Division Two.

There was some promotion between the three Wessex League divisions, but no relegation, and Division Two was disbanded at the end of the season, leaving the league with two divisions. Clubs with a specified level of facilities were promoted to Division One.

For sponsorship reasons, the league was known as the Sydenhams Wessex League.

== League tables ==
=== Premier Division ===
The new Premier Division consisted of 20 clubs, reduced from 22 the previous season, after Winchester City, Thatcham Town and Andover were promoted to the Southern League, Portland United were demoted to the Dorset Premier League, and B.A.T. Sports and A.F.C. Newbury were demoted to the third tier after they suffered problems with their grounds. Four new clubs were promoted from the second tier:

- Brading Town
- Downton
- Horndean
- Ringwood Town

Pos	Team	Pld	W	D	L	GF	GA	GD	Pts	Qualification
1	Gosport Borough (C, P)	38	27	8	3	87	27	+60	89	Joined the Southern League
2	A.F.C. Totton	38	27	8	3	89	31	+58	89	
3	VT	38	24	8	6	76	44	+32	80	
4	Poole Town	38	23	4	11	88	41	+47	73	
5	Bournemouth	38	20	10	8	69	38	+31	70	
6	Wimborne Town	38	19	10	9	82	54	+28	67	
7	Moneyfields	38	21	3	14	69	46	+23	66	
8	Fareham Town	38	18	12	8	95	57	+38	65 (Note: Fareham Town and Alton Town each had one point deducted.)	
9	Cowes Sports	38	17	9	12	61	50	+11	60	
10	Brading Town	38	15	7	16	74	80	−6	52	
11	Bemerton Heath Harlequins	38	13	9	16	55	73	−18	48	
12	Lymington Town	38	13	8	17	49	48	+1	47	
13	Brockenhurst	38	10	11	17	52	66	−14	41	
14	Christchurch	38	9	10	19	47	63	−16	37	
15	Hamworthy United	38	9	10	19	49	70	−21	37	
16	Horndean	38	11	1	26	51	104	−53	34	
17	Alton Town	38	9	7	22	59	87	−28	33	
18	Downton	38	7	10	21	48	89	−41	31	
19	Ringwood Town	38	5	8	25	34	85	−51	23	
20	Hamble A.S.S.C.	38	5	3	30	24	105	−81	18	

(C) Champions; (P) Promoted

=== Division One ===
The new Division One consisted of 19 clubs, reduced from 22 the previous season, after Brading Town, Downton, Horndean and Ringwood Town were promoted to the top tier, Bishops Waltham Town and Whitchurch United were relegated to the third tier, and three new clubs joined:

- Promoted from the third tier:
- Laverstock & Ford
- Verwood Town
- also:
- Warminster Town, joining from the Wiltshire League.

Pos	Team	Pld	W	D	L	GF	GA	GD	Pts	Promotion
1	Hayling United (C, P)	36	27	4	5	116	32	+84	85	Promoted to the Premier Division
2	Alresford Town (P)	36	23	8	5	53	28	+25	77	Promoted to the Premier Division
3	Romsey Town (P)	36	22	6	8	68	36	+32	72	Promoted to the Premier Division
4	Locks Heath	36	21	7	8	78	40	+38	70	Left the league at the end of the season
5	Fawley	36	18	7	11	78	57	+21	61	
6	Verwood Town	36	17	9	10	73	46	+27	60	
7	Stockbridge	36	17	8	11	64	54	+10	59	
8	Warminster Town	36	16	9	11	63	48	+15	57	
9	Shaftesbury	36	15	9	12	58	47	+11	54	
10	United Services Portsmouth	36	12	10	14	76	68	+8	46	
11	Farnborough North End	36	11	13	12	40	56	−16	46	
12	Laverstock & Ford	36	12	9	15	55	65	−10	45	
13	Liss Athletic	36	11	10	15	59	73	−14	42 (Note: Liss Athletic had one point deducted.)	
14	Hythe & Dibden	36	9	9	18	54	81	−27	36	
15	East Cowes Victoria Athletic	36	10	6	20	49	101	−52	36	
16	Blackfield & Langley	36	9	5	22	66	104	−38	32	
17	Petersfield Town	36	7	6	23	50	98	−48	27	
18	Amesbury Town	36	5	10	21	57	78	−21	25	
19	Andover New Street	36	5	5	26	37	82	−45	20	

(C) Champions; (P) Promoted

=== Division Two ===
The new Division Two consisted of 18 clubs, increased from 17 the previous season, after Laverstock & Ford and Verwood Town were promoted, and Micheldever and Netley Central Sports left the league. Five new clubs joined:

- Demoted from the top tier:
- A.F.C. Newbury
- B.A.T. Sports
- Relegated from the second tier:
- Bishops Waltham Town
- Whitchurch United
- also:
- Wellow, joining from the Southampton League.
- Ordnance Survey were renamed Stoneham.

Pos	Team	Pld	W	D	L	GF	GA	GD	Pts	Promotion or relegation
1	Fleetlands (C)	30	25	2	3	101	18	+83	77	Left the league at the end of the season
2	Tadley Calleva (P)	30	23	5	2	103	33	+70	74	Promoted to Division One
3	Wellow	30	19	6	5	77	36	+41	63	Left the league at the end of the season
4	A.F.C. Portchester (P)	30	16	4	10	68	45	+23	52	Promoted to Division One
5	B.A.T. Sports (P)	30	15	6	9	61	49	+12	51	Promoted to Division One
6	Otterbourne	30	15	6	9	60	50	+10	51	Left the league at the end of the season
7	Overton United	30	14	6	10	66	55	+11	48	Left the league at the end of the season
8	Paulsgrove	30	14	3	13	69	63	+6	45	Left the league at the end of the season
9	Clanfield	30	10	7	13	60	59	+1	37	Left the league at the end of the season
10	Colden Common	30	11	3	16	66	76	−10	36	Left the league at the end of the season
11	Fleet Spurs (P)	30	10	5	15	55	58	−3	35	Promoted to Division One
12	Whitchurch United (P)	30	10	4	16	48	61	−13	34	Promoted to Division One
13	A.F.C. Aldermaston (P)	30	10	4	16	61	78	−17	34	Promoted to Division One
14	Stoneham	30	9	6	15	51	76	−25	33	Left the league at the end of the season
15	Hamble Club	30	1	4	25	29	130	−101	7	Left the league at the end of the season
16	QK Southampton	30	0	5	25	18	106	−88	5	Left the league at the end of the season
17	A.F.C. Newbury	0	0	0	0	0	0	0	0	Resigned, record expunged
18	Bishops Waltham Town	0	0	0	0	0	0	0	0	Resigned, record expunged

(C) Champions; (P) Promoted
