= 2007–08 Wessex Football League =

Wessex Football League
- Season: 2007–08
- Champions: A.F.C. Totton

The 2007–08 Wessex Football League was the 22nd season of the Wessex Football League. The league champions for the first time in their history were A.F.C. Totton, who were promoted to the Southern League. The league consisted of two divisions, Division Two having been disbanded. There was some promotion and relegation between the two Wessex League divisions.

For sponsorship reasons, the league was known as the Sydenhams Wessex League.

== League tables ==
=== Premier Division ===
The Premier Division consisted of 23 clubs, increased from 20 the previous season, after Gosport Borough were promoted to the Southern League. Four new clubs joined:

- Alresford Town, runners-up in Division One.
- Hayling United, champions of Division One.
- New Milton Town, after resigning from the Southern League.
- Romsey Town, third-placed in Division One.

Pos	Team	Pld	W	D	L	GF	GA	GD	Pts	Qualification or relegation
1	A.F.C. Totton (C, P)	44	33	7	4	120	39	+81	106	Joined the Southern League
2	VT	44	32	6	6	106	35	+71	102	
3	Wimborne Town	44	30	6	8	125	33	+92	96	
4	Poole Town	44	29	9	6	120	35	+85	96	
5	Bournemouth	44	27	12	5	92	40	+52	93	
6	Brockenhurst	44	23	11	10	87	55	+32	80	
7	Moneyfields	44	24	7	13	82	45	+37	79	
8	Fareham Town	44	22	9	13	87	65	+22	75	
9	Cowes Sports	44	20	13	11	91	59	+32	73	
10	Hamworthy United	44	19	8	17	55	54	+1	65	
11	Horndean	44	15	13	16	76	73	+3	58	
12	Hayling United	44	15	9	20	66	101	−35	54	
13	Bemerton Heath Harlequins	44	15	8	21	74	101	−27	53	
14	Alton Town	44	15	7	22	66	89	−23	52	
15	Brading Town	44	13	12	19	67	85	−18	51	
16	Christchurch	44	15	5	24	67	80	−13	50	
17	Hamble A.S.S.C.	44	11	14	19	47	72	−25	47	
18	Romsey Town	44	12	7	25	68	98	−30	43	
19	New Milton Town	44	11	8	25	58	88	−30	41	
20	Lymington Town	44	11	7	26	63	103	−40	39 (Note: Lymington Town had one point deducted.)	
21	Alresford Town	44	9	8	27	48	88	−40	35	
22	Ringwood Town (R)	44	5	9	30	45	124	−79	24	Relegated to Division One
23	Downton (R)	44	1	3	40	29	177	−148	6	Relegated to Division One

(C) Champions; (P) Promoted; (R) Relegated

=== Division One ===
Division One consisted of 21 clubs, increased from 19 the previous season, after Hayling United, Alresford Town and Romsey Town were promoted to the Premier Division, and Locks Heath left the league. Six clubs were promoted from Division Two after it was disbanded:

- A.F.C. Aldermaston (13th in Division Two)
- A.F.C. Portchester (4th)
- Fleet Spurs (11th)
- Tadley Calleva (2nd)
- Totton & Eling, having changed their name from B.A.T. Sports (5th)
- Whitchurch United (12th)

Pos	Team	Pld	W	D	L	GF	GA	GD	Pts	Promotion
1	Tadley Calleva (C)	40	33	3	4	134	45	+89	102	
2	Laverstock & Ford (P)	40	29	3	8	124	59	+65	90	Promoted to the Premier Division
3	Farnborough North End	40	26	9	5	101	30	+71	87	
4	Verwood Town	40	23	6	11	94	63	+31	75	
5	Totton & Eling	40	22	8	10	80	50	+30	74	
6	Fawley	40	22	5	13	94	44	+50	71	
7	Warminster Town	40	20	11	9	89	48	+41	71	
8	Petersfield Town	40	21	7	12	90	53	+37	70	
9	United Services Portsmouth	40	21	6	13	98	65	+33	69	
10	Blackfield & Langley	40	18	10	12	70	57	+13	64	
11	Amesbury Town	40	16	5	19	100	86	+14	53	
12	Shaftesbury	40	14	9	17	73	63	+10	51	
13	Stockbridge	40	11	12	17	47	61	−14	45	
14	A.F.C. Portchester	40	11	9	20	59	86	−27	42	
15	Fleet Spurs	40	12	6	22	64	95	−31	42	
16	Liss Athletic	40	8	10	22	58	95	−37	34	Left the league at the end of the season
17	Whitchurch United	40	8	10	22	51	97	−46	34	
18	East Cowes Victoria Athletic	40	8	10	22	50	103	−53	34	
19	Andover New Street	40	9	5	26	54	117	−63	32	
20	Hythe & Dibden	40	6	9	25	42	125	−83	27	
21	A.F.C. Aldermaston	40	4	3	33	31	161	−130	15	

(C) Champions; (P) Promoted
