= 2009–10 Wessex Football League =

Wessex Football League
- Season: 2009–10
- Champions: Poole Town

The 2009–10 Wessex Football League was the 24th season of the Wessex Football League. The league champions for the second time in succession were Poole Town, who were again denied promotion to the Southern League due to ground grading problems. Wimborne Town were promoted as runners-up. There was the usual programme of promotion and relegation between the two Wessex League divisions.

For sponsorship reasons, the league was known as the Sydenhams Wessex League.

== League tables ==
=== Premier Division ===
The Premier Division consisted of 22 clubs, the same as the previous season, after VT were promoted to the Southern League, and Hamble A.S.S.C. and Horndean were relegated to Division One. Three new clubs joined:

- Blackfield & Langley, runners-up in Division One.
- Totton & Eling, champions of Division One.
- Winchester City, relegated from the Southern League.

Pos	Team	Pld	W	D	L	GF	GA	GD	Pts	Qualification or relegation
1	Poole Town (C)	42	35	4	3	128	40	+88	109	
2	Wimborne Town (P)	42	29	4	9	113	43	+70	91	Joined the Southern League
3	Bemerton Heath Harlequins	42	28	7	7	84	48	+36	91	
4	Bournemouth	42	27	7	8	87	49	+38	88	
5	Christchurch	42	22	12	8	91	66	+25	78	
6	Fareham Town	42	23	7	12	72	53	+19	76	
7	Totton & Eling	42	22	8	12	69	52	+17	74	
8	Blackfield & Langley	42	20	6	16	74	68	+6	66	
9	Newport (IOW)	42	15	14	13	61	55	+6	59	
10	Romsey Town	42	15	13	14	64	57	+7	58	
11	Winchester City	42	13	18	11	66	59	+7	57	
12	Moneyfields	42	15	8	19	60	72	−12	53	
13	Brockenhurst	42	13	12	17	62	77	−15	51	
14	Brading Town	42	14	7	21	54	68	−14	49	
15	Hayling United	42	11	11	20	51	84	−33	44	
16	Hamworthy United	42	11	9	22	49	62	−13	42	
17	Alresford Town	42	9	11	22	56	81	−25	38	
18	Alton Town	42	10	8	24	50	91	−41	38	
19	New Milton Town	42	9	9	24	45	70	−25	36	
20	Lymington Town	42	9	7	26	52	81	−29	34	
21	Laverstock & Ford	42	7	7	28	53	111	−58	28	
22	Cowes Sports (R)	42	6	9	27	54	108	−54	27	Relegated to Division One

(C) Champions; (P) Promoted; (R) Relegated

=== Division One ===
Division One consisted of 21 clubs, the same as the previous season, after Totton & Eling and Blackfield & Langley were promoted to the Premier Division, and two clubs were relegated from the Premier Division:

- Hamble A.S.S.C.
- Horndean

Pos	Team	Pld	W	D	L	GF	GA	GD	Pts	Promotion or relegation
1	Hamble A.S.S.C. (C, P)	40	26	7	7	102	43	+59	85	Promoted to the Premier Division
2	Fawley (P)	40	25	7	8	125	63	+62	82	Promoted to the Premier Division
3	Fleet Spurs	40	24	4	12	102	63	+39	76	
4	Downton	40	22	10	8	96	57	+39	76	
5	Ringwood Town	40	22	8	10	79	55	+24	74	
6	A.F.C. Portchester	40	22	7	11	85	60	+25	73	
7	Verwood Town	40	21	5	14	72	57	+15	68	
8	Petersfield Town	40	20	6	14	88	74	+14	66	
9	United Services Portsmouth	40	19	8	13	96	73	+23	65	
10	Whitchurch United	40	16	13	11	85	50	+35	61	
11	Amesbury Town	40	17	10	13	92	84	+8	61	
12	Horndean	40	18	6	16	92	74	+18	60	
13	Stockbridge	40	16	10	14	81	75	+6	58	
14	Warminster Town	40	15	4	21	66	85	−19	49	
15	Tadley Calleva	40	12	11	17	68	75	−7	47	
16	Hythe & Dibden	40	14	5	21	72	84	−12	47	
17	East Cowes Victoria Athletic	40	11	9	20	70	88	−18	42	
18	Farnborough North End	40	9	12	19	63	76	−13	39	Transferred to the Combined Counties League
19	Andover New Street	40	7	8	25	75	141	−66	29	
20	Shaftesbury	40	5	5	30	53	151	−98	19 (Note: Shaftesbury had one point deducted.)	
21	A.F.C. Aldermaston (R)	40	1	1	38	29	163	−134	4	Relegated to the Hampshire League

(C) Champions; (P) Promoted; (R) Relegated
