= 2025–26 Wessex Football League =

Wessex Football League
- Season: 2025–26

The 2025–26 Wessex Football League season was the 40th in the history of the Wessex Football League since its establishment in 1986. The league consists of two divisions: the Premier Division and Division One.

The constitution was announced on 15 May 2025. The Premier Division (step 5) promotes two clubs; one as champions and one via a four-team play-off.

== Premier Division ==
The Premier Division remained at 20 clubs, after A.F.C. Portchester and Fareham Town were promoted to the Isthmian League South Division, and Blackfield & Langley and United Services Portsmouth were relegated to Division One.

Four new teams joined the division:

- Two promoted from Division One:
  - East Cowes Victoria Athletic
  - New Milton Town
- One transferred from the Southern Combination League Premier Division:
  - Petersfield Town
- One demoted voluntarily from Southern League Division One South:
  - Bemerton Heath Harlequins (not eligible for promotion as a consequence of their resignation from a higher league)

=== League table ===
Pos	Team	Pld	W	D	L	GF	GA	GD	Pts	Promotion, qualification or relegation
1	A.F.C. Stoneham (C, P)	38	31	3	4	109	33	+76	96	Promoted to the Isthmian League South Central Division
2	Hamble Club	38	25	7	6	105	35	+70	82	Qualified for the play-offs
3	Portland United (O, P)	38	25	3	10	90	41	+49	78	Qualified for the play-offs
4	Andover New Street	38	21	7	10	66	42	+24	70	Qualified for the play-offs
5	Laverstock & Ford	38	20	9	9	75	57	+18	69	Qualified for the play-offs
6	Hamworthy Recreation	38	20	6	12	75	50	+25	66	
7	Baffins Milton Rovers	38	19	6	13	75	53	+22	63	
8	Sherborne Town	38	18	8	12	70	52	+18	62	
9	Brockenhurst	38	17	10	11	74	54	+20	61	
10	Downton	38	19	4	15	82	71	+11	61	
11	Petersfield Town	38	18	4	16	64	55	+9	58	
12	Millbrook	38	16	6	16	82	66	+16	54	
13	Cowes Sports	38	12	4	22	46	95	−49	40	
14	East Cowes Victoria Athletic	38	11	4	23	48	84	−36	37	
15	Christchurch	38	9	8	21	67	94	−27	35	
16	Bemerton Heath Harlequins	38	10	5	23	46	94	−48	35	
17	Hythe & Dibden	38	8	10	20	56	100	−44	34	
18	Bournemouth	38	7	8	23	46	86	−40	29	
19	Wincanton Town	38	6	7	25	47	97	−50	25	Voluntary demotion to the Western League First Division
20	New Milton Town (R)	38	5	7	26	41	105	−64	19 (Note: New Milton Town had three points deducted.)	Relegated to Division One

Source: Wessex League
Rules for classification: 1) points; 2) goal difference; 3) number of goals scored.
(C) Champions; (O) Play-off winners; (P) Promoted; (R) Relegated

=== Play-offs ===
Semi-finals
2	Hamble Club	2 (6)
5	Laverstock & Ford	2 (7)
3	Portland United	2
4	Andover New Street	0

Final
3	Portland United	0 (5)
5	Laverstock & Ford	0 (3)

==== Semifinals ====
21 April 2026	Hamble Club	2–2 (6–7 p)	Laverstock & Ford	Hamble-le-Rice
19:45	Yeomans 40' 84'		Colmer 61', Lovegrove 90+4'	Stadium: The Abbey; Attendance: 203

22 April 2026	Portland United	2–0	Andover New Street	Portland
19:45	Delves 15', Corbridge 25'			Stadium: Camp & Satherley Stadium; Attendance: 580

==== Final ====
25 April 2026	Portland United	0–0 (5–3 p)	Laverstock & Ford	Portland
15:00		Report		Stadium: Camp & Satherley Stadium; Attendance: 810
	Penalties
	Corbridge (penalty scored); Borthwick (penalty scored); Scott (penalty scored); Nixon (penalty scored); Camp (penalty scored)		Colmer (penalty scored); Lovegrove (penalty scored); Cegielka (penalty missed); Arnold (penalty scored)

=== Results table ===
Home \ Away	STO	ANS	BMR	BHH	BOU	BRK	CHR	COW	DOW	ECV	HMB	HWR	H&D	L&F	MIL	NMT	PET	PLD	SHE	WIN
A.F.C. Stoneham	—	0–3	2–1	1–0	4–0	3–3	3–0	2–0	9–0	4–0	3–0	1–1	5–1	2–0	2–1	9–0	3–1	4–1	4–0	3–0
Andover New Street	0–2	—	1–1	2–1	2–1	1–3	0–2	4–1	3–0	4–1	2–2	1–0	1–1	2–0	2–0	2–0	0–2	2–1	2–1	2–0
Baffins Milton Rovers	2–3	2–2	—	7–1	0–1	2–0	3–1	4–1	6–0	2–0	2–1	1–1	3–0	0–2	1–2	7–1	0–2	1–0	2–1	0–3
Bemerton Heath Harlequins	1–3	0–3	0–3	—	4–2	0–2	2–2	2–2	1–0	1–0	0–4	2–1	1–1	3–3	1–3	6–2	0–2	0–2	1–3	3–2
Bournemouth	0–0	1–4	1–2	0–1	—	1–0	2–3	1–2	2–2	0–0	1–1	0–4	3–0	1–2	2–2	2–3	1–4	0–3	1–2	2–0
Brockenhurst	3–2	0–0	1–1	7–0	3–0	—	3–1	4–0	3–3	2–1	3–2	0–2	2–1	0–0	5–1	4–0	0–3	0–2	1–1	0–1
Christchurch	2–3	4–0	2–4	0–2	0–2	1–1	—	2–2	1–2	4–1	1–2	2–4	1–3	1–1	1–2	5–5	3–3	0–6	1–6	6–1
Cowes Sports	0–5	1–4	3–2	2–0	3–1	1–3	1–0	—	1–3	0–1	0–4	0–2	1–3	2–3	4–3	4–0	0–5	2–1	0–4	2–2
Downton	2–4	3–4	2–4	1–0	1–1	7–1	3–1	2–1	—	5–0	3–0	0–3	2–1	5–1	2–1	4–0	1–2	1–3	5–0	5–0
East Cowes Victoria Athletic	0–2	1–0	2–3	0–0	6–2	0–3	2–1	1–2	1–3	—	2–0	5–2	4–4	0–1	1–3	0–2	4–1	0–1	1–4	3–1
Hamble Club	0–1	2–1	1–1	7–0	5–0	4–1	3–0	6–0	3–0	6–0	—	3–1	7–1	3–1	4–0	3–0	1–0	3–2	2–2	2–2
Hamworthy Recreation	1–2	0–3	1–2	1–2	5–1	1–1	4–4	3–0	3–1	4–1	0–2	—	3–1	2–0	2–0	3–0	0–2	2–1	4–0	2–2
Hythe & Dibden	2–4	3–3	0–2	3–0	1–0	0–7	1–2	1–1	2–1	2–3	0–5	0–2	—	1–2	0–6	3–1	3–1	4–1	1–1	3–3
Laverstock & Ford	1–4	0–2	5–0	3–0	4–0	1–0	2–2	2–0	2–0	3–1	1–1	3–3	2–1	—	0–3	0–0	3–2	2–1	4–1	2–1
Millbrook	2–3	1–1	1–1	4–2	1–4	6–2	4–1	3–0	0–1	1–1	0–3	1–3	7–1	2–5	—	3–1	0–2	1–2	1–0	5–0
New Milton Town	0–1	0–2	0–1	3–2	3–3	1–1	0–1	2–3	0–4	1–2	3–6	0–1	3–0	3–3	0–4	—	1–1	0–3	2–3	2–1
Petersfield Town	1–2	1–0	2–0	4–2	2–1	0–1	1–3	1–2	1–2	3–0	1–2	0–1	2–2	1–1	0–3	1–0	—	1–0	1–4	3–0
Portland United	2–1	2–0	2–1	6–1	3–0	2–0	2–1	6–1	3–3	3–0	0–2	3–0	4–1	3–2	3–3	4–0	4–0	—	2–0	2–1
Sherborne Town	2–1	2–0	3–0	1–0	2–2	0–2	6–1	3–0	2–0	3–0	0–0	1–2	2–2	0–2	1–1	2–1	2–3	0–0	—	3–0
Wincanton Town	0–2	0–1	2–1	2–4	2–4	2–2	2–4	0–1	1–3	1–3	0–3	2–1	2–2	4–6	2–1	1–1	3–2	1–4	0–2	—

Source: FA Full-Time Grid
Legend: Blue = home team win; Yellow = draw; Red = away team win.
For upcoming matches, an "a" indicates there is an article about the rivalry between the two participants.

=== Stadia and locations ===
Location of the clubs in the 2025–26 Wessex Football League Premier Division (Dorset)
Location of the clubs in the 2025–26 Wessex Football League Premier Division (Hampshire)

Club	Location	Stadium	Capacity
A.F.C. Stoneham	Eastleigh	Stoneham Lane Football Complex	1,000
Andover New Street	Charlton	Foxcotte Park	1,000
Baffins Milton Rovers	Portsmouth	PMC Stadium	
Bemerton Heath Harlequins	Bemerton	Moon Park	2,100
Bournemouth	Bournemouth	Victoria Park	3,000
Brockenhurst	Brockenhurst	Grigg Lane	2,000
Christchurch	Hurn	Hurn Bridge Sports Club	2,000
Cowes Sports	Cowes	Westwood Park	2,000
Downton	Downton	Brian Whitehead Sports Ground	2,000
East Cowes Victoria Athletic	East Cowes	Beatrice Avenue	1,000
Hamble Club	Hamble-le-Rice	Hamble Community Facility	
Hamworthy Recreation	Wimborne	Magna Road	1,500
Hythe & Dibden	Dibden	Clayfields Sport Centre	1,000
Laverstock & Ford	Laverstock	Church Road	
Millbrook	Southampton	Test Park	1,000
New Milton Town	New Milton	Fawcetts Field	3,000
Petersfield Town	Petersfield	The Southdown Builders Stadium	3,000
Portland United	Portland	Camp and Satherley Stadium	2,000
Sherborne Town	Sherborne	Raleigh Grove	1,150
Wincanton Town	Wincanton	Wincanton Sports Ground	1,000

== Division One ==
Division One was increased to 22 clubs from 20 after East Cowes Victoria Athletic and New Milton Town were promoted to the Premier Division, and Verwood Town were relegated.

Five new teams joined the division:

- Two relegated from the Premier Division:
  - Blackfield & Langley
  - United Services Portsmouth
- One transferred from Combined Counties Football League Division One:
  - Yateley United
- One promoted from the Hampshire Premier League:
  - Colden Common
- One promoted from the Wiltshire League:
  - Kintbury Rangers

=== League table ===
Pos	Team	Pld	W	D	L	GF	GA	GD	Pts	Promotion, qualification or relegation
1	Fleetlands (C, P)	42	30	5	7	87	43	+44	95	Promoted to the Premier Division
2	Folland Sports	42	28	5	9	115	56	+59	89	Qualification for the play-offs
3	Colden Common	42	27	7	8	124	63	+61	88	Qualification for the play-offs
4	Yateley United (O, P)	42	28	3	11	122	53	+69	87	Qualification for the play-offs
5	Whitchurch United	42	27	4	11	105	66	+39	85	Qualification for the play-offs
6	Cove	42	24	11	7	79	43	+36	83	
7	Newport (IOW)	42	21	9	12	84	61	+23	72	
8	Romsey Town	42	20	7	15	81	64	+17	67	
9	Hamworthy United	42	17	11	14	100	73	+27	62	
10	Ringwood Town	42	19	3	20	88	83	+5	60	
11	Amesbury Town	42	16	8	18	84	72	+12	56	
12	Kintbury Rangers	42	14	11	17	70	87	−17	53 (Note: The match between United Services Portsmouth and Kintbury Rangers on 29 April 2026 was awarded to Kintbury as US Portsmouth were unable to raise a team.)	
13	Frimley Green	42	14	10	18	94	101	−7	52 (Note: The match between Frimley Green and United Services Portsmouth on 25 April 2026 was awarded to Frimley Green as US Portsmouth were unable to raise a team.)	
14	Lymington Town	42	15	5	22	60	95	−35	50	
15	A.F.C. Aldermaston	42	14	6	22	64	75	−11	48	
16	Clanfield	42	14	5	23	70	84	−14	47	Transferred to the Southern Combination League Division One
17	Alresford Town	42	12	10	20	78	103	−25	46	
18	Ash United	42	10	8	24	43	96	−53	38	
19	Fawley	42	8	12	22	47	90	−43	36	
20	Totton & Eling	42	10	6	26	49	95	−46	36	Reprieved from relegation
21	Blackfield & Langley (R)	42	9	6	27	47	116	−69	30 (Note: Blackfield & Langley had three points deducted.)	Relegated to the Hampshire Premier League Senior Division
22	United Services Portsmouth (R)	42	7	4	31	46	118	−72	25	Relegated to the Hampshire Premier League Senior Division

Source: Wessex Leagues
Rules for classification: 1) points; 2) goal difference; 3) number of goals scored.
(C) Champions; (O) Play-off winners; (P) Promoted; (R) Relegated

=== Play-offs ===
Semi-finals
2	Folland Sports	0
5	Whitchurch United	1
4	Yateley United	2
3	Colden Common	1

Final
4	Yateley United	6
5	Whitchurch United	1

==== Semifinals ====
28 April 2026	Folland Sports	0–1	Whitchurch United	Hamble-le-Rice
19:45			Thorne 5'	Stadium: Folland Park; Attendance: 180

29 April 2026	Yateley United	2–1	Colden Common	Yateley*
19:45	62', 71'		Stone 32'	Stadium: Sean Devereux Park; Attendance: 407

- * The semi-final tie between Colden Common and Yateley United was switched to Yateley due to Colden Common's groundshare with Winchester City, who had a game on the same night.

==== Final ====
2 May 2026	Yateley United	6–1	Whitchurch United	Yateley
15:00				Stadium: Sean Devereux Park; Attendance: 908

=== Results table ===
Home \ Away	ALD	ALR	AME	ASH	B&L	CLA	COL	COV	FAW	FLN	FOL	FRI	HWU	KIN	LYM	NEW	RIN	ROM	T&E	USP	WHI	YAT
A.F.C. Aldermaston	—	2–1	3–2	0–1	0–3	2–0	1–1	1–4	0–1	0–1	1–2	1–2	0–1	0–1	3–0	3–0	1–3	0–1	0–1	4–1	4–0	1–3
Alresford Town	4–4	—	0–1	5–1	3–2	0–2	1–4	1–1	1–1	1–1	2–2	4–3	1–1	4–2	3–3	1–6	2–0	0–3	3–2	6–1	1–0	2–9
Amesbury Town	3–4	2–2	—	2–0	4–0	0–0	3–4	3–3	4–1	0–2	2–0	3–2	3–1	0–2	4–2	0–2	3–4	3–1	4–0	5–1	1–4	3–4
Ash United	0–2	2–1	1–0	—	2–1	3–3	3–4	1–3	2–1	0–3	0–6	1–1	1–5	1–2	1–3	3–1	0–2	0–0	3–0	2–1	0–3	2–6
Blackfield & Langley	1–1	0–4	2–2	2–0	—	2–1	1–4	2–2	1–0	1–2	1–3	3–3	0–3	1–3	2–5	1–2	2–1	1–5	1–1	2–0	0–1	0–5
Clanfield	2–3	3–1	1–2	4–1	6–1	—	1–2	0–5	3–0	0–2	2–1	0–3	6–6	0–3	2–1	1–0	4–5	3–2	1–0	2–0	0–3	0–3
Colden Common	5–2	4–2	3–1	1–1	10–0	4–1	—	3–1	4–0	1–4	0–0	3–0	0–1	3–0	3–1	2–1	4–2	2–3	1–1	4–3	4–0	2–1
Cove	1–0	4–0	3–0	2–0	3–0	1–0	2–4	—	1–0	0–0	0–0	2–2	2–1	2–2	2–0	1–0	1–0	3–1	2–0	3–1	1–0	3–0
Fawley	1–1	1–0	0–3	0–0	0–3	2–1	2–6	0–1	—	2–4	0–4	4–3	1–7	1–1	2–2	2–2	0–2	0–3	0–3	2–0	0–3	2–3
Fleetlands	2–2	3–2	0–1	3–0	4–3	1–0	1–1	3–1	2–1	—	0–1	4–0	4–2	2–1	1–0	2–1	1–0	2–2	2–1	3–0	2–1	1–0
Folland Sports	4–1	10–1	2–1	0–2	7–0	3–0	3–2	3–2	1–1	1–2	—	2–0	3–3	3–1	6–0	2–1	5–4	2–0	4–0	2–0	7–3	1–2
Frimley Green	3–2	2–2	1–1	2–2	2–0	2–2	5–2	1–0	1–4	1–2	2–3	—	4–4	4–4	6–0	5–1	1–3	0–3	3–1	H/W	3–4	0–7
Hamworthy United	2–1	4–2	1–1	3–0	1–2	0–1	3–3	1–3	3–0	0–2	0–2	5–3	—	7–1	3–0	2–4	2–1	2–2	7–3	1–1	4–3	4–0
Kintbury Rangers	1–2	0–2	1–5	1–1	2–4	2–0	1–6	1–1	2–2	3–0	4–2	4–3	1–1	—	3–1	2–0	0–5	0–2	3–0	3–1	1–1	0–3
Lymington Town	0–2	1–0	2–0	2–0	2–0	3–2	2–2	1–5	2–2	1–8	1–2	1–3	2–1	3–2	—	1–1	1–3	1–0	0–3	2–0	2–4	0–1
Newport (IOW)	3–0	2–1	3–0	3–1	4–0	1–1	1–0	1–1	2–2	2–0	2–4	3–2	3–2	3–3	2–1	—	3–3	2–0	1–0	4–0	4–1	1–1
Ringwood Town	3–2	1–0	3–0	5–0	4–0	2–5	2–4	1–1	1–0	1–2	4–2	0–4	1–3	2–1	2–4	2–2	—	1–2	1–2	1–4	1–4	5–1
Romsey Town	3–2	2–6	1–1	4–1	3–0	3–2	2–4	0–1	3–3	4–0	0–1	1–3	2–1	2–2	1–2	4–1	2–0	—	2–0	5–3	2–3	1–0
Totton & Eling	1–2	0–3	0–0	1–1	1–0	2–1	0–5	1–1	2–3	0–4	1–4	6–3	0–0	3–2	1–2	0–4	1–2	2–0	—	3–1	5–7	1–3
United Services Portsmouth	0–1	2–2	0–9	0–1	1–1	2–5	1–3	1–4	1–0	3–2	0–2	1–4	3–2	A/W	4–0	1–2	1–3	1–1	2–0	—	1–4	3–1
Whitchurch United	1–1	4–0	3–1	4–2	2–1	3–1	2–0	1–0	2–2	1–3	4–2	5–1	0–0	2–0	1–2	1–0	3–1	1–0	4–0	9–0	—	3–2
Yateley United	6–2	5–1	3–1	4–0	7–0	2–1	1–0	6–0	0–1	1–0	4–1	1–1	1–0	2–2	2–1	2–3	3–1	2–3	3–0	8–0	4–0	—

Source: FA Full-Time Grid
Legend: Blue = home team win; Yellow = draw; Red = away team win.
For upcoming matches, an "a" indicates there is an article about the rivalry between the two participants.

=== Stadia and locations ===
Location of the clubs in the 2025–26 Wessex Football League Division One

Club	Location	Stadium	Capacity
A.F.C. Aldermaston	Aldermaston	Waterside Park (groundshare with Thatcham Town)	1,500
Alresford Town	New Alresford	Arlebury Park	1,000
Amesbury Town	Amesbury	Bonnymead Park	1,000
Ash United	Ash	Shawfield Road	2,500
Blackfield & Langley	Fawley	Gang Warily Recreation Centre	2,500
Clanfield	Havant	Westleigh Park (groundshare with Havant & Waterlooville)	5,300
Colden Common	Otterbourne	Charters Community Stadium (groundshare with Winchester City)	4,500
Cove	Farnborough	Squirrel Lane	
Fawley	Holbury	Waterside Sports & Social Club	1,000
Fleetlands	Gosport	DARA Fleetlands	1,000
Folland Sports	Hamble-le-Rice	Folland Park	1,000
Frimley Green	Frimley Green	Frimley Green Recreation Ground	2,000
Hamworthy United	Poole	County Ground	1,000
Kintbury Rangers	Kintbury	The Recreation Ground	
Lymington Town	Lymington	The Sports Ground	1,000
Newport (IOW)	Newport	Beatrice Avenue (groundshare with East Cowes Victoria)	1,000
Ringwood Town	Ringwood	Long Lane	1,000
Romsey Town	Romsey	Southampton Road	
Totton & Eling	Southampton	Little Testwood Farm	1,500
United Services Portsmouth	Portsmouth	Victory Stadium	1,000
Whitchurch United	Whitchurch	Longmeadow	1,000
Yateley United	Yateley	Sean Devereux Park	500
