= Lee Molyneaux =

English footballer (born 1983)

Personal information
- Full name: Lee Alexander Molyneaux
- Date of birth: 16 January 1983 (age 43)
- Place of birth: Portsmouth, England
- Position: Defender

Youth career
- Portsmouth

Senior career*
| Years | Team | Apps | (Gls) |
| 2001–2003 | Portsmouth | 0 | (0) |
| 2003 | Derry City | 6 | (0) |
| 2004 | Weymouth | 1 | (0) |
| 2004 | Selsey | | |
| 2004–2005 | Oxford United | 16 | (0) |
| 2005–2006 | Basingstoke Town | | |
| 2006–2008 | Cirencester Town | | |
| 2008–2009 | Forest Green Rovers | 4 | (0) |
| 2009–2010 | Clevedon Town | | |
| 2010 | Gloucester City | 8 | (0) |
| 2011–2015 | Gosport Borough | 83 | (2) |
| 2015–2019 | Havant & Waterlooville | 58 | (1) |
| 2017 | → Gosport Borough (loan) | 3 | (0) |
| 2019–2020 | Gosport Borough | 2 | (0) |
| 2020–2021 | AFC Portchester | 4 | (0) |
| 2021–2022 | Baffins Milton Rovers | 33 | (0) |
| 2022 | Horndean | 2 | (0) |
| 2022–2023 | Locks Heath | 9 | (1) |

Managerial career
- 2019–2020: Gosport Borough
- * Club domestic league appearances and goals as of 08:47, 30 June 2022 (UTC)

Lee Alexander Molyneaux (born 16 January 1983) is an English footballer who plays as a defender. He is the former manager of Gosport Borough.

His former clubs include Portsmouth, Derry City of the League of Ireland, Weymouth, Selsey, Oxford United, Basingstoke Town, Cirencester Town and Forest Green Rovers.

== Career ==
Molyneaux came through the ranks at Portsmouth, 2 years in the Academy and 1 year as a professional Lee, along with many other players was released the year that Portsmouth were promoted to the Premier League. He joined Derry City in Northern Ireland before returning to the UK, joining Weymouth during Christmas 2003, making his debut on 1 January 2004 in a local derby against Dorchester Town. After appearing for Selsey during second half of the season, Oxford United manager Graham Rix signed him on a 1-year contract for the 2004–05 season after impressing in pre-season matches and training. It ended in November 2005 when a new manager came in. He then moved to Basingstoke Town, and from there Cirencester Town in 2006.

In July 2008, he joined Forest Green Rovers in the Conference National. He had previously featured for the club's reserve team squad while studying for a degree at Hartpury College. He was released by Forest Green in December 2008.

He then signed for Clevedon Town in January 2009. He then moved to Gloucester City before leaving in 2010.

In the summer of 2011, Molyneaux joined Gosport Borough, at the time in the Southern League Division One South & West winning back to back promotions and leading them out at Wembley in the FA Trophy Cup Final.

Molyneaux moved to Havant & Waterlooville for the 2015–16 season, making eighteen league appearances as the club were relegated from the National League South. In November 2017, having helped Havant earn again back to back promotion getting them to the National League, he rejoined Gosport, now struggling in the Southern League Premier Division, on a month's loan. He made his second début for Gosport in a 1–0 victory over Dunstable Town, their first win of the season.

On 8 June 2021, Molyneaux returned to playing, joining Wessex League side Baffins Milton Rovers.

In October 2022, Molyneaux joined Hampshire Premier League side Locks Heath having started the season with Horndean.

== Managerial career ==
After acting as a player-coach at Havant & Waterlooville for the 2018–19 season, he was appointed the manager of Gosport Borough in May 2019. In June 2020, he stepped down from his role as Gosport manager. He started the following season as assistant manager at AFC Portchester.
