= A.F.C. Aldermaston =

Association football club in England

Coordinates: 51°23′29″N 1°14′33″W

AFC Aldermaston
- Full name: Association Football Club Aldermaston
- Nickname: The Atom Men
- Founded: 1952
- Ground: Waterside Park, Thatcham
- Chairman: Martin Desay
- Manager: Marcus Richardson
- League: Wessex League Division One
- 2025–26: Wessex League Division One, 15th of 22
- Website: https://afcaldermaston.co.uk
Home colours	Away colours

A.F.C. Aldermaston is a football club based in Aldermaston, Berkshire, England. Affiliated to the Berks & Bucks Football Association, the club are currently members of the Wessex League Division One and play at Waterside Park in Thatcham.

The club motto, Facta Non Verba, comes from a Latin phrase meaning "deeds, not words".

== History ==
The club was founded as AWRE Football Club in 1952 by Charles Green, Ted Hall, Gordon Carter, and Don Sharp, and were nicknamed "the Atom Men" after the newly founded Atomic Weapons Research Establishment. As the AWRE complex was still under construction when the club was established, the players used empty contractors' huts as changing rooms – carrying the tin bath into whichever building was designated for that day's football. The players were also responsible for the pitch, and would mow and mark out the pitch before the match started. The club received support from William Penney during his work at AWRE on the Operation Hurricane project.

In the late 1960s/early 1970s, the club was asked to change its name, and became AFC Aldermaston. In 1979 they were promoted from the Reading & District League into Division One of the Hellenic League, where they spent the next seven seasons. From 1986 until 1991 the club played in local football leagues, including the North Hampshire League, before joining Division Three of the Hampshire League in 1991. They finished fifth in their first season, earning promotion to Division Two. However, they were relegated back to Division Three the following season, where they remained until 1999. Upon reorganisation of the Hampshire League prior to the 1999–2000 season, Aldermaston were placed in the Premier Division.

When the Hampshire and Wessex Leagues merged in 2004, Aldermaston became members of Division Two of the Wessex League. They were relegated to Division Three at the end of the 2004–05 season. The division was renamed Division Two in 2006, and was disbanded at the end of the 2006–07 season, with Aldermaston moved up to Division One.

During the 2009–10 season, the club lost 40 consecutive games, breaking the previous record of 39 straight losses held jointly by Stockport United and Poole Town. The 40th defeat came on 8 April 2010, a 2–0 loss to Downton. This led to news reports proclaiming them the "worst English football team in history" as well as gaining international attention. Chairman Damion Bone stated that he believed that the poor performance over the season was due to players' commitments; the club had also lost ten players to Tadley Calleva before the start of the season. The losing streak ended on 10 April 2010, when the club drew 1–1 against Warminster Town, with the following match against Petersfield Town resulting in a 2–1 win for Aldermaston.

The run of defeats saw the club finish bottom of Division One with just one win in 40 matches, resulting in relegation to the Hampshire Premier League, At the end of the 2013–14 season, they switched to the Premier Division of the Thames Valley Premier League. After finishing seventh in the Premier Division in 2015–16, the club were promoted to Division One East of the Hellenic League. At the end of the 2020–21 season they were transferred to Division One of the Combined Counties League. They were transferred to Division One of the Wessex League at the end of the 2022–23 season.

=== Season-by-season record ===
Season	Division	Position	Significant events
1979–80	Hellenic League Division One	7/16	
1980–81	Hellenic League Division One	12/16	
1981–82	Hellenic League Division One	15/16	
1982–83	Hellenic League Division One	15/16	
1983–84	Hellenic League Division One	13/18	
1984–85	Hellenic League Division One	13/17	
1985–86	Hellenic League Division One	16/16	Left league
1986–1991	A.F.C. Aldermaston played in local football, mainly the North Hampshire League		
1991–92	Hampshire League Division Three	4/14	Promoted
1992–93	Hampshire League Division Two	17/18	Relegated
1993–94	Hampshire League Division Three	9/16	
1994–95	Hampshire League Division Three	18/18	
1995–96	Hampshire League Division Three	10/18	
1996–97	Hampshire League Division Three	15/20	
1997–98	Hampshire League Division Three	11/16	
1998–99	Hampshire League Division Three	15/18	League re-organisation
1999–2000	Hampshire League Premier Division	21/22	
2000–01	Hampshire League Premier Division	21/21	
2001–02	Hampshire League Premier Division	21/21	
2002–03	Hampshire League Premier Division	20/20	
2003–04	Hampshire League Premier Division	17/18	League merged into Wessex League
2004–05	Wessex League Division Two	22/22	Relegated
2005–06	Wessex League Division Three	9/16	Division Three renamed Division Two at end of season
2006–07	Wessex League Division Two	13/16	League re-organisation
2007–08	Wessex League Division One	21/21	
2008–09	Wessex League Division One	14/21	
2009–10	Wessex League Division One	21/21	Relegated
2010–11	Hampshire Premier League	15/17	
2011–12	Hampshire Premier League	9/18	
2012–13	Hampshire Premier League	8/17	
2013–14	Hampshire Premier League Senior Division	10/17	Switched leagues
2014–14	Thames Valley Premier League Premier Division	5/14	
2015–16	Thames Valley Premier League Premier Division	7/14	Promoted
Source: FCHD

== Ground ==
The club's base is at the Recreational Society (commonly abbreviated to "Rec Soc") at the Atomic Weapons Establishment in Aldermaston, having been founded shortly after the complex's establishment. The ground has three full-sized football pitches. Until 1990, the society's Head Groundsman was Eddie Seaward. After leaving Aldermaston, Seaward became Head Groundsman at Wimbledon's All England Lawn Tennis Club, and received an MBE in 2007 for services to sport.

Prior to the 2021–22 season the club's first team moved their home games to Thatcham Town's Waterside Park as the Rec Soc ground no longer met the ground grading requirements for their level.

== Records ==
- Highest league position: 7th in Hellenic League Division One, 1979–80
- Best FA Vase performance: First Round 2025–26, 2026-27

== See also ==
- A.F.C. Aldermaston managers
