= Sway F.C. =

- Full name: Sway Football Club
- Founded: 1908
- Ground: Jubilee Field
- Capacity: 1,000
- Chairman: Paul Briers
- Manager: Ian Hugglestone
- League: Hampshire Premier League Division 1
- Website: https://www.pitchero.com/clubs/swayfootballclub/
Home colours	Away colours

Sway F.C. are a long running amateur football club based in Sway, a New Forest village in Hampshire, England.

A fully accredited club, they are affiliated to the Hampshire Football Association and run 13 sides at various age categories, from Under 7's through to the Men's 1st Team who play in the Hampshire Premier League.

== History ==
Sway were founded in 1908 and spent their early days playing friendly fixtures before joining the New Forest League.

The club played at the Memorial Ground at Pitmore Lane and progressed on to the Bournemouth League, where they enjoyed plenty of success.

In 1969, Sway were elected to the Hampshire League Division 3 West, but frequently struggled and after twice finishing bottom they were relegated in 1975.

Back in the Bournemouth League, Sway returned to form and in 1977 they completed the treble after winning the league title, Bournemouth Senior Cup and the Pickford Cup at Dean Court, Bournemouth.

These successes saw a return to the county league, and this time they were better prepared; winning two promotions to a competitive Division 2 where they did well to consolidate until relegation in 1990.

Back in the Bournemouth League, Sway enjoyed mixed fortunes but the move to the Jubilee Sports Field in 2005 sparked a revival with successive titles being won in 2007 and 2008.

Further title successes resulted in promotion to the Hampshire Premier League Division 1 in 2015, progressing up to the Senior Division two years later. The club have since consolidated themselves at this level and twice won the League Cup.

The Junior section (established in 1988) has continued to grow with more sides frequently being added, including a girls team.

== Honours ==
- Hampshire League
  - Division 4 Runners-up 1977–78
- Hampshire Premier League
  - Division 1 Runners-up 2016–17
  - League Cup Winners 2017-18 and 2021–22
- Bournemouth League
  - Premier Division Champions 2007–08 and 2012-13
  - Division 1 Champions 1945–46, 1976–77 and 2006–07
  - Division 2 Champions 2004-05 (Reserves)
- Bournemouth Football Association
  - Senior Cup Winners 1976-77 and 1977–78
  - Pickford Cup Winners 1976-77 and 2005–06
  - Page Croft Cup Winners 2012–13, Finalists 2016-17 (Reserves)

== League career ==
Season	Competition	Position	Significant events
1945-69	Bournemouth League		
1969/70	Hampshire League Division 3 West	10/16	
1970/71	Hampshire League Division 3 West	12/16	
1971/72	Hampshire League Division 3 West	13/16	
1972/73	Hampshire League Division 4	16/16	
1973/74	Hampshire League Division 4	8/16	
1974/75	Hampshire League Division 4	16/16	Relegated
1975-77	Bournemouth League		
1977/78	Hampshire League Division 4	2/16	Promoted
1978/79	Hampshire League Division 3	6/16	
1979/80	Hampshire League Division 3	8/15	
1980/81	Hampshire League Division 2	8/20	League restructure
1981/82	Hampshire League Division 2	17/20	
1982/83	Hampshire League Division 2	18/20	
1983/84	Hampshire League Division 2	8/18	
1984/85	Hampshire League Division 2	16/18	
1985/86	Hampshire League Division 2	16/18	
1986/87	Hampshire League Division 2	16/18	League restructure following creation of the Wessex League
1987/88	Hampshire League Division 2	16/19	
1988/89	Hampshire League Division 2	17/19	
1989/90	Hampshire League Division 2	18/18	Left competition
1990-2015	Bournemouth League		
2015/16	Hampshire Premier League Division 1	7/11	
2016/17	Hampshire Premier League Division 1	2/9	Promoted
2017/18	Hampshire Premier League Senior Division	11/16	League Cup winners
2018/19	Hampshire Premier League Senior Division	6/16	
2019/20	Hampshire Premier League Senior Division		Season abandoned due to COVID-19 pandemic
2020/21	Hampshire Premier League Senior Division		Season abandoned due to COVID-19 pandemic
2021/22	Hampshire Premier League Senior Division	9/16	League Cup winners
2022/23	Hampshire Premier League Senior Division	15/17	
2023/24	Hampshire Premier League Senior Division	12/16	
2024/25	Hampshire Premier League Senior Division	16/16	Relegated
2025/26	Hampshire Premier League Division 1	10/14	
2026/27	Hampshire Premier League Division 1		

== Ground ==
Sway play at Jubilee Field, Station Road, Sway, SO41 6BE. The venue has a stand and a permanent pitch barrier. The club are planning to install floodlights so that they are eligible for promotion.

The Memorial Ground is still used by Sway Juniors and the Cricket Club.

== Notable former players ==
Sam Vokes and Josh McQuoid both played for Sway Juniors in the nineties before turning professional.

== Local rivalries ==
Sway enjoyed a healthy rivalry with number of New Forest clubs. Bashley, Brockenhurst, Lymington Town, New Milton and Lyndhurst regarded as their main rivals.

== Print ==
- Sway FC 75th Anniversary 1908–84 by Les Castle
