= LAFC (disambiguation) =

Los Angeles FC (LAFC) is an American professional soccer club.

LAFC may also refer to the following association football clubs:

== England ==
- Liskeard Athletic F.C.
- Liss Athletic F.C.
- Lutterworth Athletic F.C.

== Wales ==
- Llanelli A.F.C.
- Llangeinor A.F.C.
- Llanwern A.F.C.

== Scotland ==
- Leith Athletic F.C.
- Lochgelly Albert F.C.

== Malta ==
- Lija Athletic F.C.
