= Otterbourne F.C. =

Association football club in England

- Full name: Otterbourne Football Club
- Nickname: Otters
- Founded: 1962
- Dissolved: 2016
- Ground: Oakwood Park, Otterbourne, Hampshire
Home colours	Away colours

Otterbourne F.C. were a long running amateur football club based in Otterbourne, a village near Winchester in Hampshire, England. They ran for 53 years and were long standing members of the Hampshire League before their untimely demise.

== History ==
Originally based in Eastleigh, the club was founded in 1962 as North End Old Boys. They joined the Southampton League and rapidly climbed up through the junior ranks to reach the Senior section in 1969. Further progress was made and by 1975 had reached the Premier Division, where they soon consolidated.

In 1986, they became known as Otterbourne F.C. after relocating to Oakwood Park in that village. This ambitious move soon paid dividends as they won the title and made a successful application to join the Hampshire League. The 'Otters' remained in Division 2 for thirteen successive seasons and enjoyed several good cup runs – most notably in 1996 when they won both the Hampshire League and Southampton Senior Cups (the final of which was played at The Dell, Southampton).

Otterbourne joined the expanded Wessex League in 2004 when they were placed in the competition's controversial and short lived third tier, but when the division was axed in 2007, they became founder members of the Hampshire Premier League, where they finished runners-up in the inaugural season.

After a spell of mediocrity, their fortunes dramatically took off in 2014 when Richard Luffman was appointed manager. With an influx of vastly experienced players, he transformed them from mid-table also-rans to serious title contenders.

In 2016 they finished-runners-up and won both the Hampshire Intermediate and Andover Open Cups, but were ineligible for promotion after Otterbourne Parish Council had unsurprisingly rejected their application to install floodlights. The ambitious management and players were understandably frustrated by this, so accepted an exciting opportunity to join Alresford Town en masse.

This was the end for Otterbourne, who then suddenly decided to finish on a high note and disband. The farewell match was played on 7th May 2016, an emotional Past v Present fixture, which ironically, attracted a record crowd of over 200.

== Honours ==
=== 1st team ===
- Hampshire Football Association
  - Intermediate Cup Winners 2015/16. Finalists 1991/92 and 2004/05
- Hampshire League
  - League Cup Winners 1995/96
- Hampshire Premier League
  - Senior Division Runners-up 2007/08 and 2015/16
- Southampton Football Association
  - Senior Cup Winners 1995/96
  - Junior 'A' Cup Finalists 1967/68
- Southampton League
  - Premier Division Champions 1986/87
  - Junior Division 5 Champions 1965/66
- Other
  - Andover Open Cup Winners 2015/16

=== Second Team ===
- Hampshire Premier League
  - Combination Cup Winners 2009/10
- Southampton League
  - Senior Division 2 Champions 1988/89

=== Third Team ===
- Southampton League
  - Junior Division 2 Champions 2001/02
  - Junior Division 8 Champions 1980/81

== League career 1986–2016 ==
Season	Division	Position	Significant events
1986/87	Southampton League Premier Division	1/14	Promoted
1987/88	Hampshire League Division 2	6/19	
1988/89	Hampshire League Division 2	6/19	
1989/90	Hampshire League Division 2	12/18	
1990/91	Hampshire League Division 2	15/18	
1991/92	Hampshire League Division 2	6/15	
1992/93	Hampshire League Division 2	12/18	
1993/94	Hampshire League Division 2	9/17	
1994/95	Hampshire League Division 2	9/17	
1995/96	Hampshire League Division 2	10/18	
1996/97	Hampshire League Division 2	3/18	
1997/98	Hampshire League Division 2	3/16	
1998/99	Hampshire League Division 2	8/18	Re-organisation
1999/00	Hampshire League Division 1	15/18	Relegated
2000/01	Hampshire League Division 2	5/16	
2001/02	Hampshire League Division 2	10/16	
2002/03	Hampshire League Division 2	8/13	
2003/04	Hampshire League Division 2	8/15	Left competition
2004/05	Wessex League Division 3	6/22	
2005/06	Wessex League Division 3	8/17	
2006/07	Wessex League Division 3	6/18	Left Competition
2007/08	Hampshire Premier League	2/17	
2008/09	Hampshire Premier League	7/18	
2009/10	Hampshire Premier League	8/18	
2010/11	Hampshire Premier League	9/18	
2011/12	Hampshire Premier League	16/18	
2012/13	Hampshire Premier League	16/18	
2013/14	Hampshire Premier League Senior Division	11/18	Competition absorbed Hampshire League 2004
2014/15	Hampshire Premier League Senior Division	3/18	
2015/16	Hampshire Premier League Senior Division	2/18	Left Competition

== Ground ==
Otterbourne F.C. played at Oakwood Park Recreation Ground, Oakwood Avenue, Otterbourne, SO21 2ED.

The venue has a modern pavilion with a licensed bar. The pitch has a permanent fixed barrier along the near side and is still used today – ironically by fierce rivals Colden Common from 2019 to 2025 and then by Southampton League outfit Sporting Wessex.

== Notable players ==
Dave Diaper and the ex-Southampton defender Kevin Moore, played for the club after retiring from the professional game.

== Local rivalries ==
Due to their location between Eastleigh and Winchester, Otterbourne had a number of local rivals; the nearest being Compton, Twyford and most notably Colden Common with whom many a battle was fought over the years.
