= Colin Sullivan (footballer) =

English footballer

Personal information
- Date of birth: 24 June 1951 (age 75)
- Place of birth: Saltash, Cornwall, England
- Height: 5 ft 8 in (1.73 m)
- Position: Defender

Youth career
- Plymouth Argyle

Senior career*
Years	Team	Apps	(Gls)
1968–1974	Plymouth Argyle	230	(7)
1974–1979	Norwich City	157	(3)
1979–1981	Cardiff City	63	(1)
1981	Hereford United	8	(0)
1981–1984	Portsmouth	94	(0)
1984–1986	Swansea City	53	(0)
1986–?	Locks Heath	?	(?)

International career
1973	England U23	2	(0)
- * Club domestic league appearances and goals

Colin Sullivan (born 24 June 1951) is an English former footballer who played at left back for most of his career. At the time of his debut he was the youngest to play for Plymouth Argyle. As of 2013 he runs a gardening business.

He began his career at Plymouth Argyle, training with the amateur players on Tuesday and Thursday evenings, and made his debut away to Rotherham United on 19 March 1968, three months before his seventeenth birthday. He remained with the club until June 1974 when he was transferred to Norwich City for £70,000, making his debut for the club on 17 August 1974 against Blackpool. He went on to appear in the 1975 Football League Cup final for the club losing 1–0 to Aston Villa at Wembley. In February 1979, he moved to Cardiff City where he remained until 1981, and then followed a brief spell at Hereford United. He then appeared for Portsmouth and Swansea City before leaving the league in 1986 to play for Locks Heath.

== Honours ==
Norwich City

- Football League Cup runner-up: 1974–75

Portsmouth

- Football League Third Division: 1982–83
