= Yateley United F.C. =

Association football club in England

- Full name: Yateley United F.C.
- Founded: 2013
- Ground: Sean Devereux Park
- Manager: Jordan Blake
- League: Combined Counties League Premier Division South
- 2025–26: Wessex League Division One, 4th of 22 (promoted via play-offs)
- Website: https://www.yateleyunitedfc.co.uk/

Yateley United Football Club is a football club based in Yateley, Hampshire, England. They are currently members of the Combined Counties League Premier Division South and play at Sean Devereux Park.

== History ==
Yateley United F.C. was formed in 2013 through a merger of four local clubs: Yateley, Yateley Green, Yateley Youth and Beaulieu. Yateley F.C. began in 1902 playing in local leagues, and changed their name to Yateley Town in 1978. That year, they joined the new Home Counties League, subsequently renamed the Combined Counties League. The club struggled in the league until they left in 1984. The club split into two in 1985, and a new club, Yateley Green, was formed. While Yateley Town dropped into the Aldershot Senior League, winning it in 2003, Yateley Green joined the Hampshire League.

Yateley Green reached the Hampshire League Division One in 2000, and they competed near the bottom of that division until they dropped back to Division Two in 2003. They then joined the new Division Three of the Wessex Football League in 2004–05. Yateley Green finished bottom in their first season and left the league. After dropping back to the Aldershot & District League, they joined the Surrey Elite Intermediate League in 2012, winning it in their first season. Yateley Green then merged with the original Yateley club (renamed from Yateley Town), plus Beaulieu (formed in 1972) and Yateley Youth, to form Yateley United.

Yateley United took Yateley Green's place in the Surrey Elite Intermediate League, but dropped down to the Surrey County Intermediate League (Western) in 2017. After one season, they moved to Division Two of the Hellenic League. In 2021, they joined the Thames Valley Premier League, and in 2022–23, won the league with a 100% record. They were then promoted to Division One of the Combined Counties League ahead of the 2023–24 season.

== Records ==
- Best FA Vase performance: First round, 2024–25
