= Baffins Milton Rovers F.C. =

Association football club in England

Coordinates: 50°49′24″N 1°2′37″W

Baffins Milton Rovers
- Full name: Baffins Milton Rovers Football Club
- Founded: 2011
- Ground: Kendall Stadium, Portsmouth
- Chairman: Steve Cripps
- Manager: Pete Stiles and Matt Powell
- League: Wessex League Premier Division
- 2025–26: Wessex League Premier Division, 7th of 20
- Website: bmrfc.co.uk
Home colours	Away colours

Baffins Milton Rovers Football Club is a football club based in Portsmouth, Hampshire, England. They are currently members of the Wessex League Premier Division and play at the Kendall Stadium.

== History ==
The club was formed in 2011 following the amalgamation of two successful Sunday league clubs Baffins Milton and Milton Rovers. Both clubs had won several league and cup titles in the Portsmouth Dockyard and Meon Valley leagues. The new club joined the Premier Division of the Portsmouth Saturday League and were champions in their first season. After finishing as Premier Division runners-up the following season, they moved up to the Senior Division of the Hampshire Premier League.

Baffins Milton Rovers were Hampshire Premier League champions in their first season in the league. They also won the League Cup with a 4–0 win over Colden Common in the final, and the Portsmouth Senior Cup, beating Moneyfields 4–0 in the final at Fratton Park. After finishing as Senior Division runners-up in 2014–15, the club were champions again in 2015–16, as well as winning the Portsmouth Senior Cup for a second time after beating Havant & Waterlooville's Southdowns College Team 3–1 in the final.

As Hampshire Premier League champions and having moved to their new Kendall Stadium, Baffins were promoted to Division One of the Wessex League for the 2016–17 season. They went on to finish as runners-up in the division, earning promotion to the Premier Division, as well as reaching the Wessex League Cup final, eventually losing 2–1 to Premier Division Sholing. The following season saw them win the League Cup, beating Portland United 1–0 in the final. They won the League Cup again in 2022–23 with a 4–2 win over Petersfield Town. The 2023–24 season saw them finish fifth in the Premier Division, qualifying for the promotion play-offs. They went on to lose 2–1 to AFC Stoneham in the semi-finals.

== Ground ==
The club initially played on the southern pitch at the Langstone Harbour Sports Ground. In 2015 they obtained a 50-year lease from Portsmouth City Council for the northern section of the sports ground and started to develop it in preparation for promotion. They moved to the new ground in time for the 2015–16 season, and it was named the Kendall Stadium after one of its sponsors. Developments included a new 120-seater stand, changing rooms, perimeter fence and concreting, with £70,000 in grants contributing to the £100,000 costs . Further upgrades in summer 2016 included new floodlights, dug-outs and spectator toilets. A £33,189 grant from the Premier League through the Football Stadia Improvement Fund part-funded the £50,000 costs. The upgrades allowed the club to be accepted for promotion to Wessex League Division One for the 2016–17 season, having won the Hampshire Premier League for the second time in 2015–16.

The new ground was officially opened on 3 August 2016 in a pre-season friendly match with Salisbury. A new clubhouse was opened during 2017–18 season, with a new covered terrace also built. Portsmouth F.C. Women began sharing the ground at the start of the 2018–19 season.

== Honours ==
- Wessex League
  - League Cup winners 2018–19, 2022–23
- Hampshire Premier League
  - Senior Division champions 2013–14, 2015–16
  - League Cup winners 2013–14
- Portsmouth Saturday League
  - Premier Division champions 2011–12
- Portsmouth Senior Cup
  - Winners 2013–14, 2015–16

== Records ==
- Best FA Cup performance: First qualifying round, 2022–23, 2024–25, 2026–27
- Best FA Vase performance: Fourth round, 2018–19

== See also ==
- Baffins Milton Rovers F.C. players
