= Matt Crossley =

English footballer (born 1968)

Personal information
- Full name: Matthew John William Crossley
- Date of birth: 18 March 1968 (age 58)
- Place of birth: Basingstoke, England
- Position: Defender

Senior career*
Years	Team	Apps	(Gls)
1986–1987	Overton United		
1987–1997	Wycombe Wanderers	330	(11)
1997–2000	Kingstonian	167	(3)
2000–2001	Aldershot		
- Basingstoke Town
- Newbury Town
- Rushden & Diamonds
- Aldershot Town
- * Club domestic league appearances and goals

Matthew John William Crossley (born 18 March 1968) is an English former footballer who played as a central defender.

== Playing career ==
Born in Basingstoke, Crossley played for Aldershot, Basingstoke Town, Newbury Town, Overton United, Wycombe Wanderers, Rushden & Diamonds, Kingstonian and Aldershot Town.

== Management career ==
Crossley was appointed assistant manager at Woking in November 2002, to work alongside Glenn Cockerill.

During Woking's 1–0 victory over York City on 29 December 2006, Crossley head-butted York substitute James Dudgeon, after he had tried to intervene as a peacemaker during a touchline tussle between Neal Bishop and Woking's Danny Bunce. Crossley and Cockerill were sacked by Woking in March 2007.

== Honours ==
Wycombe Wanderers

- Football League Third Division play-offs: 1994
- Football Conference: 1992–93
- FA Trophy: 1990–91, 1992–93

Kingstonian

- Isthmian League Premier Division: 1997–98
- FA Trophy: 1998–99, 1999–2000

Andover

- Wessex League: 2001–02
