= Clanfield F.C. (Hampshire) =

Association football club in England

Coordinates: 50°52′01.48″N 0°58′26.90″W

Clanfield
- Full name: Clanfield Football Club
- Nickname: The Clan
- Founded: 1983
- Ground: Westleigh Park, Havant
- Capacity: 5,300 (710 seated)
- Chairman: Nigel Soal
- Manager: Lee Blakely
- League: Southern Combination Division One
- 2025–26: Wessex League Division One, 16th of 22 (transferred)
- Website: https://www.clanfieldfc.com/
Home colours	Away colours

Clanfield Football Club are a football club based in Havant, England. They play in the Southern Combination Division One. The club is affiliated to the Hampshire Football Association and is an FA Charter Standard Development club.

== History ==
The club was formed in 1983 with the merging of Clanfield Seniors and Clanfield Boys Club. The club joined the Hampshire League in 1997 and were founding members of the Hampshire Premier League in 2007. After finishing second in the Hampshire Premier League Senior Division at the end of the 2022–23, the club returned to the Wessex League for the first time since 2007. The club finished their first season back in ninth place.

== Ground ==
The club originally played at Peel Park in Clanfield, Hampshire before moving to play at Westleigh Park, the home of Havant & Waterlooville, during the 2020–21 season due to league regulations around floodlights. Peel Park is still used by the club for the Reserves, Development squad, Under 23’s and multiple youth setups.

== Honours ==
- Meon Valley League Division 2
  - Winners 2014/15
- Meon Valley League Division 3
  - Winners 1986/87, 2013/14
- Meon Valley League Division 4
  - Winners 2013/14
- Portsmouth & District League Junior 1
  - Winners 1991/92
- Portsmouth & District League Senior
  - Winners 1992/93
- Portsmouth & District League Premier
  - Winners 1993/94
- Hampshire League Division 3
  - Winners 1998/99
- Hampshire Intermediate Cup
  - Winners 1998/99
