= Overton United F.C. =

Association football club in England

Coordinates: 51°14′44.19″N 1°15′52.51″W

Overton United
- Full name: Overton United Football Club
- Founded: 1913
- Ground: Overton Recreation Centre, Bridge Street, Overton
- Chairman: Richard Lloyd
- Manager: Jack Hannam and Dan Schofield
- League: Hampshire Premier League Senior Division
- 2025–26: Hampshire Premier League Division One, 2nd of 14 (promoted)
Home colours	Away colours

Overton United Football Club is an English football club based in Overton, near Basingstoke in Hampshire. The club is affiliated to the Hampshire Football Association, and is an FA Charter Standard club. They currently play in the Hampshire Premier League Senior Division.They also have a reserve side, Overton United reserves play in the Basingstoke Saturday league, they also have a Veterans Sunday side along with a Sunday side in the Basingstoke Sunday League.

== History ==
The club has been playing football since at least 1932, starting in the local Basingstoke leagues.

In 1970 Overton joined the Hampshire League Division 3 East, where they promptly won promotion as runners-up. After a series of promising seasons in Division 2, a 4th place final position in 1975 was enough to clinch promotion to Division 1. In a highly competitive top-flight, Overton did well to survive their first season, but were relegated back in 1977 and stayed there until the end of the 1985–86 season when they won promotion to Division 1. Four seasons later they were relegated back to Division 2, but after two seasons were promoted back up in 1991–92 as Runners up. They stayed in Division 1 until 1997 when they finished bottom and were relegated again. After a league re-organisation they were placed in Division 1, but lasted only one season and were back in Division 2 for the start of the 2000–01 season. In 2002–03 they finished as runners up of Division 2 again and were promoted back again. After one season the club joined the newly formed Division 3 of the Wessex League in 2004–05. They played in the league for three seasons where they became one of the founder members of Hampshire Premier League, and have stayed in this division ever since. In 2012, Ex-Basingstoke Town goalkeeper and Hampshire League Referee, John Findlay, was appointed chairman of the club. He stepped down from the role at the start of the 2013/14 season and was replaced by Gary Savory. Savory resigned from the position during the 2015/16 season, and Adrian Gibbons took over. In 2017, Derek Burry was appointed as the club's new chairman. Derek Burry stepped down as the role at the end of 2017/18 season and Gary Savory came back as chairman for the 2018/19 season with Richard Lloyd as vice chairman.Gary Savory stepped down and the start of 2021/2022 with Richard Lloyd stepping into the role of chairman.

== Ground ==
Overton United play their games at Overton Recreation Centre, Bridge Street, Overton RG25 3HE.

== Honours ==
- Hampshire League Division 2'
  - Runners Up: 1991–92 and 2002–03
- Hampshire League Division 3 East'
  - Runners Up: 1970–71
- Hampshire Football Association Junior 'A' Cup'
  - Winners: 1965-66 and 1966–67

== Records ==
- Highest league position: 7th in Wessex League Division Two: 2004–05, 2006–07

== Former players ==
1. Players that have played/managed in the football league or any foreign equivalent to this level (i.e. fully professional league).

- (England) Matt Crossley

2. Players with full international caps.
