= Millbrook F.C. =

Coordinates: 50°55′50″N 1°28′4″W

Millbrook
- Full name: Millbrook Football Club
- Nickname: Dockers
- Founded: 2002; 24 years ago
- Ground: Test Park, Southampton
- Manager: Nathan Morgan & Connor Doswell
- League: Wessex League Premier Division
- 2024–25: Wessex League Premier Division, 8th of 20
Home colours

Millbrook Football Club is a football club based in Southampton, England. They are currently members of the Wessex League Premier Division and play at Test Park.

== History ==
Bush Hill were formed in 2002, joining the Southampton Saturday League. In 2013, the club joined the Hampshire Premier League Division One, winning the league in their first season, gaining promotion to the Senior Division. In 2017 and 2019, the club won the Premier Division.

On 10 March 2021, the club announced they would be renaming to Millbrook, to represent the area of Millbrook in Southampton, following the merger with Oakwood Youth. In 2021, the club was admitted into the Wessex League Division One. Millbrook entered the FA Vase for the first time in 2021–22.

The Club made history in the 2023-24 season when they were promoted to Step 5 for the first time. After finishing 2nd in the league, The Dockers went on to win the Play Off Final 3-1 against 3rd place Downton.

== Ground ==
The club currently play at Test Park in Southampton, following a spell at Mansel Park.
