= Hamble Club F.C. =

Association football club in England

Coordinates: 50°52′4″N 1°19′49″W

Hamble Club
- Full name: Hamble Club Football Club
- Nickname: The Monks
- Founded: 1969
- Ground: The Abbey, Hamble-le-Rice
- Chairman: Steve Harris
- Manager: Mathew Gregory
- League: Wessex League Premier Division
- 2025–26: Wessex League Premier Division, 2nd of 20
Home colours	Away colours

Hamble Club Football Club is a football club based in Hamble-le-Rice, Hampshire. They are currently members of the Wessex League Premier Division and play at the Abbey.

== History ==
The club was established in 1969, originally as a youth team. They later became members of the Southampton Saturday League, where they played until joining Division Three of the Hampshire League in 1993. The club were Division Three champions in 1996–97, earning promotion to Division Two. In 2004 the Hampshire League merged into the Wessex League, with Hamble becoming members of the new Division Three. In 2006 the division was renamed Division Two, but at the end of the 2006–07 the division was disbanded and the club became founder members of the Hampshire Premier League.

Hamble pulled out of the Hampshire Premier League during the 2012–13 season. Although they were readmitted the following season, they started in the newly formed second tier of the league, Division One. The club were Division One runners-up in 2013–14 and were promoted to the Senior Division, before going on to win the Senior Division in 2014–15. After finishing third the following season they were promoted to Division One of the Wessex League. The club were Division One champions in 2016–17, earning promotion to the Premier Division. In 2023–24 they won the League Cup, beating AFC Portchester 2–0 in the final. The 2024–25 season saw the club finish fourth in the Premier Division, qualifying for the promotion play-offs, in which they lost 2–0 to Fareham Town at the semi-final stage.

Hamble were runners-up in the Premier Division in 2025–26, going on to lose their play-off semi-final against Laverstock & Ford on penalties. They also won the League Cup, beating AFC Stoneham 3–2 in the final.

== Ground ==
The club play their games at the Abbey. The ground was formerly known as the Shell Mex Ground.

== Honours ==
- Wessex League
  - Division One champions 2016–17
  - League Cup winners 2023–24, 2025–26
- Hampshire League
  - Division Three champions 1996–97
- Hampshire Premier League
  - Senior Division champions 2014–15

== Records ==
- Best FA Cup performance: Preliminary round, 2018–19, 2019–20, 2023–24
- Best FA Vase performance: Fifth round, 2017–18
