= Downton F.C. =

Association football club in England

Coordinates: 50.9924°N 1.7640°W

Downton
- Full name: Downton Football Club
- Nickname: The Robins
- Founded: 1905
- Ground: Brian Whitehead Sports Ground, Downton
- Chairman: Mark Stevens
- Manager: Ollie Cherrett
- League: Wessex League Premier Division
- 2024–25: Wessex League Premier Division, 18th of 20
Home colours	Away colours

Downton Football Club is a football club based in Downton, near Salisbury, Wiltshire, England. Affiliated to the Wiltshire Football Association, they are currently members of the Wessex League Premier Division and play at the Brian Whitehead Sports Ground on Wick Lane.

== History ==
The club was established in September 1905. They joined the Salisbury & District League after World War I and were promoted to Division One at the end of the 1919–20 season. However, the club were relegated back to Division Two in 1923–24. The following season saw them win the league's Norman Court Cup, which they won again five times before World War II and three times after the war. The club also won the Wiltshire Junior Cup in 1949–50. In 1950 they joined the Bournemouth League, quickly gaining promotion to Division One. After winning Division One on five occasions, the club was promoted to Senior Division One at the end of the 1958–59 season and went on to win the league seven times in the next nine seasons, also winning the League Cup in 1961–62, 1963–64 and 1966–67, as well as the Bournemouth Senior Cup in 1962–63.

In 1968 Downton moved up to Division Three West of the Hampshire League. League reorganisation saw them become members of Division Three in 1971 as the regional divisions were abolished and replaced with a third and fourth tier. In 1978–79 the club were Division Three runners-up, earning promotion to Division Two. A third-place finish in Division Two the following season saw them promoted to Division One, with the club also winning the Bournemouth Senior Cup and the Wiltshire Senior Cup. They retained the Wiltshire Senior Cup the following season. Although the club avoided relegation after finishing bottom of Division One in 1984–85, they finished bottom of the division again the following season and were relegated to Division Two.

Downton were Division Two runners-up in 1987–88, securing an immediate return to Division One. After finishing third in Division One in 1992–93, the club moved up to the Wessex League. They won the League Cup in 1994–95, a season that also saw them win the Hampshire FA's Russell Cotes Cup. When the league gained a second division in 2004, Downton became members of Division One. However, after finishing bottom of the division in 2004–05 they were relegated to Division Two. The following season saw the club finish fourth, earning promotion back to the renamed Premier Division. They were relegated again in 2007–08, having finished bottom of the Premier Division. The club went on to win the Division One title in 2010–11 to earn promotion back to the Premier Division, but were relegated to Division One in 2013–14.

In 2023–24 Downton finished third in Division One, qualifying for the promotion play-ffs/ After beating Alresford Town 2–0 in the semi-finals, they lost the final 3–1 to Millbrook. However, they were subsequently granted promotion to the Premier Division to fill vacancies in the divisions above.

== Honours ==
- Wessex League
  - Division One champions 2010–11
  - League Cup winners 1995–96
- Bournemouth League
  - League Cup winners 1961–62, 1963–64, 1966–67
- Salisbury & District League
  - Norman Court Cup winners 1924–25, 1931–32, 1933–34, 1934–35, 1935–36, 1938–39
- Wiltshire Senior Cup
  - Winners 1979–80, 1980–81, 2021–22
- Russell Cotes Cup
  - Winners 1995–96
- Salisbury Hospital Cup
  - Winners 2008–09, 2009–10, 2011–12
- Bournemouth Senior Cup
  - Winners 1962–63, 1979–80
- Wiltshire Junior Cup
  - Winners 1949–50

== Records ==
- Best FA Cup performance: First qualifying round, 1997–98, 1998–99, 2000–01, 2006–07, 2008–09
- Best FA Vase performance: Quarter-finals, 2025–26

== See also ==
- Downton F.C. players
