= Paulsgrove F.C. =

Association football club in England

Coordinates: 50°50′54.15″N 1°05′46.07″W

Paulsgrove
- Full name: Paulsgrove Football Club
- Founded: 1964
- Ground: Marsden Road, Paulsgrove
- Chairman: Kevin Doughty
- Manager: Johnny Willett
- League: Hampshire Premier League Division One
- 2025–26: Hampshire Premier League Division One, 14th of 14
Home colours	Away colours

Paulsgrove Football Club is a football club based in the Paulsgrove area of Portsmouth, Hampshire, England. The club is affiliated to the Hampshire Football Association. The club is an FA Charter Standard club. The club was formed in 1964. They joined the Hampshire League Division Two in 1987 and played in that league's Division One between 1993 and 1996. They are currently members of the Hampshire Premier League Division One.

== History ==
In 1987–88, the club joined the Hampshire League in division Two, five seasons later they gained promotion to division one in the 1992–93 season. They stayed for a few seasons but were relegated back to division two in 1995–96. Three seasons later, the club were champions of Division two in the 1998–99 season. However, instead of being promoted the club remained in the second tier, now named Division one, of The Hampshire League after it was re-organised for the 1999–2000 season. In 2004–05, they then left the Hampshire league to join the newly formed Division three of the Wessex league, two seasons later this division was renamed division two.

At the end of the 2006–07 season, Paulsgrove left the Wessex league to become one of the founding members of the Hampshire Premier League. In October 2007. the club gained a bye in the Hampshire Cup under somewhat unusual circumstances: drawn at home to play Kingston Arrows (a side composed entirely of long-stay prisoners), their opponents were unable to fulfil the fixture. The club continue to play in the Hampshire Premier league and during their period in the league have won the senior league cup once in the 2008–09 season.

The 2017–18 seasons saw the club win the Hampshire Premier league senior division and the Hampshire intermediate cup.

== Ground ==
Paulsgrove play their games at Paulsgrove Social Club, Marsden Road, Paulsgrove, Portsmouth PO6 4JB.

== Honours ==
- Wessex League Division Three
  - Winners: 2005–06
- Hampshire League Division Two
  - Winners: 1998–99
- Hampshire Premier League senior division
  - Winners 2017–2018
- PEHPFL Senior Cup
  - Winners: 2008–09
  - Runners-up: 2009–10, 2011–12
- Hampshire Combination and Development League East Division
  - Winners 2021–22

== Records ==
- Highest League Position
  - 8th in Wessex league Division Two: 2006–07
