= Gosport Borough F.C. =

English football club

Coordinates: 50.7949°N 1.1566°W

Gosport Borough
- Full name: Gosport Borough Football Club
- Nickname: The Boro'
- Founded: 1944; 82 years ago
- Ground: The AEI Stadium, Privett Park, Gosport
- Capacity: 4,500 (1,000 seated)
- Chairman: Iain McInnes
- Manager: Callum Glen
- League: Southern League Premier Division South
- 2025–26: Southern League Premier Division South, 8th of 22
- Website: gosportboroughfc.com
Home colours	Away colours

Gosport Borough Football Club is a semi-professional football club based in Gosport, Hampshire, England. The club is affiliated to the Hampshire Football Association and is an FA Charter Standard Community Club. They are currently members of the Southern League Premier Division South and play at Privett Park. They also currently have the biggest youth setup in all of Hampshire.

== History ==
=== Formation and early years ===
Gosport Borough Athletic Club were founded in 1944 in an initiative to bring back organised football, athletics, swimming and cycling to the town of Gosport after a break of several years.

In their first season (1944–45), the football section of the Club won the Portsmouth and District League Division One under the guidance of former Southampton player, Stan Cribb. The line-up at that time included Jimmy Scoular and Peter Harris, who both went on to become full internationals.

For their second season, the club were accepted into the Hampshire League and won the Division One title at their first attempt. This feat was not repeated for thirty-one seasons, despite the club being a major force in Hampshire football during that period.

=== The Southern League: 1978 to 1992 ===
Under the management of the long-serving former club skipper Tony Brickwood and Peter Edgar, Gosport won the Hampshire League title in successive seasons (1976–77 and 1977–78) and were elected to the Southern Football League. In the team's first four seasons, they never finished outside the top four and when the League was restructured for the start on the 1982–83 season, Gosport were placed in the Premier Division.

Two years later, Gosport lost their Premier Division status and were relegated to the Southern Division. However, the next season saw the team bounce straight back after an incredible run of sixteen wins in their final nineteen matches. "Boro'" still needed to win the final match to be certain of promotion and, in front of a home crowd in excess of 1,500, they demolished Salisbury 5–0.

In the 1987–88 season, the team were once again threatened with relegation, and until the April of that season Boro' had looked odds-on favourites for the drop. However, a run in the Hampshire Senior Cup that took the side all the way to the final – played at The Dell, home of then-Football League First Division club Southampton, lifted the players' spirits. Victory over favourites Farnborough in the final was followed by a good run of results in the league – lifting the team out of trouble to remain in the Premier Division.

The club enjoyed their highest ever finish in the 1988–89 season, when seventh place in the Premier Division was achieved. Unfortunately, a mass exodus of players and a change in the management saw the team relegated to the Southern Division the following season, before a further relegation to the Wessex League in 1992.

=== Wessex League: 1992 to 2007 ===
Following relegation, the chairman at the time, Ian Hay, appointed Roger Sherwood as manager. Although Boro' had three good seasons under Sherwood, the Wessex League Cup in 1992–93 was, in his first season in charge, his only major success.

After the departure of Sherwood at the start of the 1995–96 season, the Management Committee undertook a review of the club's policies, the result of which was to commence a period of financial consolidation and re-structuring. Three former Gosport players, John Hawes, Dave Pitt, and Barry Cook, took up the running of the side, with a new emphasis on forming a team of locally based players and developing an extensive youth policy.

In 1997, Boro' approached Gomer Football Club, a successful youth club, to form an affiliation. This presented the senior side with the opportunity to tap into emerging local talent, while also providing this talent with a chance to aim for a higher standard of football than may have been achieved normally after youth football.

Nevertheless, Boro's position in the Wessex League continued to deteriorate. Dave Pitt and Barry Cook resigned in October 1999, after a particularly difficult start to the 1999–2000 season. John Hawes became chairman of the club, but resigned from that position after one year to return to his coaching role. During this period, Ian Hay restructured the club's finances and implemented a new and relatively unique Trustee Scheme, which gave the club a firm financial base for the future. Dave Taviner, another former player, took over as caretaker manager until former reserve team manager Mick Marsh was appointed as the new first team manager in December 1999.

At the start of the 2000–01 season, Vice-chairman John Stimpson was elected to the Chairmanship of the club. He immediately agreed with Marsh that the club should continue to develop young local players and also look to include a mix of more experienced players in the first team.

Marsh, along with his assistant Gary Lee, spent five seasons as manager. In that period, the club's gradual decline was halted and Boro' were once again headed in the right direction. In Marsh's five seasons, the club finished in the top four of the Wessex League on four occasions and reached the quarter-finals of the FA Vase in 2003–04.

With Marsh retiring from the game at the end of the 2004–05 season to move to Spain, the club appointed John Robson as his successor; Robson's tenure only lasted a few months, and, in December 2005, the club appointed Alex Pike as first team manager. Pike came to Gosport with relative pedigree, having the honour of being the Wessex League's most successful manager; having won league and league cup honours on several occasions with his teams and also winning the FA Vase with Wimborne Town in 1992, his appointment seemed appropriate for a club aiming for promotion back to the Southern League.

In his first full season in charge, Pike lived up to his high reputation, and Boro' lifted the Wessex League championship title – their first title in 29 years. The championship was won on the last day of the season at title rivals AFC Totton; Boro' had to avoid defeat by two goals to lift the title and, in a nervous afternoon, eventually lost 1–0 to win the championship on goal difference.

Having captured the title, Boro' officials and supporters waited for the news from The Football Association on their application for promotion. Two weeks after lifting the title, promotion was confirmed and Boro' were elected back into the Southern League for the 2007–08 season.

=== The Southern League return: 2007 to 2013 ===
Things started well for The Boro' on their return to the Southern League – at one point the side sat third in the Southern League Division One South & West table. However, a poor run of results before and after the Christmas period saw Gosport falling off the pace and towards the lower reaches of the table, before a more balanced side picked themselves up and strung together a solid run of results to lift the team to a creditable 11th-placed finish by the end of the campaign.

The following season, 2008–09, started well and by Christmas The Boro' were looking likely to occupy a play-off place by the end of the season. However, the board of the club were forced to cut the playing budget when the Great Recession affected some of the club's business partners and sponsorship money failed to materialise. Not wishing to push the club into debt, the board handed Alex Pike a new playing budget of £0 and consequently, the last three months of the season were a struggle for the side as they slipped gradually down the table to finish 12th.

A better season followed in 2009–10, with the club threatening to achieve a play-off place all season before trailing off in the last few weeks, eventually finishing 8th but the upward momentum failed to continue into 2010–11. From the outset, Alex Pike's side stuttered through their league season – mainly due to poor form away from home, which saw the team record only four wins on the road all season. With the side rarely able to put together a run of more than a couple of wins, The Boro' slipped down the table and finished the season in 13th position, their worst since rejoining the Southern League.

However, the 2011–12 season was considerably better with Gosport continually well placed in the table, finally finishing in third place to qualify for the play-offs. Boro’ won their semi against near neighbours Sholing thanks to a superb strike by the division's leading goalscorer Justin Bennett.

In the final, away at Poole Town, Gosport trailed 0–1 until veteran striker Steve Claridge came off the bench and scored in the second minute of injury time to level the tie at 1–1, taking the game to extra-time. In extra-time, Gosport scored twice to gain promotion to the Southern League Premier Division.

2012–2013 started indifferently, with the club initially in danger of relegation. However, an FA Cup run which saw them equal their previous club best in making the fourth qualifying round, beating Bath City on the way, was a precursor to an unbeaten run of 23 games which lifted them into the play-off zone. After a run of poor results, it required results elsewhere and a narrow 1–0 victory on the last day of the season to take them into the final play-off place. A win against 2nd placed Stourbridge and a play-off final win against Hemel Hempstead (2–2 after extra time, 4–5 on penalties) saw the club promoted to the Conference South for the first time in the club's history, returning to the second tier of non-league football for the first time since 1990.

=== The Conference ===
The club initially struggled through the first two-thirds of the 2013–14 season as they came to grips with life in the Conference South. But a run in the FA Trophy gelled the team and the league performances followed. As the team progressed through round after round of the Trophy, they also climbed the league table – eventually moving well clear of the drop zone.

The Trophy run continued to a "Battle of Hampshire" two-legged semi-final against near neighbours Havant & Waterlooville which saw underdogs Gosport win 3–1 on aggregate to book a final with Cambridge United at Wembley. The final (on 23 March) ended in a 4–0 defeat despite matching their senior opponents for the first 40 minutes in front of 18,120 spectators.

During the 2014–15 season, Borough qualified for the first round proper of the FA Cup for the first time in their history. They were drawn against League One side Colchester United; the club installed additional seating and terracing to raise the capacity of Privett Park to 4,800 for the match, which was played on Sunday 9 November 2014 and resulted in a 3–6 victory for Colchester.

Boro' went on to finish sixth in the Conference South, missing out on the play-offs by just three points. They did however cap another fine season by winning the Hampshire Senior Cup for the first time since 1988. On a chilly evening in early May, they beat Southern League Sholing 3–0 at Portsmouth F.C.'s Fratton Park ground, with goals from Justin Bennett, Adam Wilde and Matt Paterson. Another big plus was the club's record goal scorer Justin Bennett winning the League's Golden Boot and booking his place in the League's "All-star" team for the 2014/15 season.

=== Financial problems hit The Boro' ===
The 2015–16 season got off to a good start with the club pushing themselves into play-off contention from the off but as the new year came, the club were hit with financial problems. Several players left the club in February and March after the club failed to pay their wages and an unpaid tax bill meant The Boro' were under a transfer embargo and could not replace the players they'd lost.

The form that had Alex Pike's men looking certain for a play-off place disappeared and the last few weeks of the season became a struggle with the team recording only one win in their remaining ten league games.

Talismanic striker Justin Bennett also announced that after nine seasons at Privett Park, he would leave the club at the end of the season but the 2015–16 campaign did at least end on a high with a 2–1 win against AFC Portchester in the Russell Cotes Cup Final and with Bennett recording his 262nd and 263rd goals in Gosport colours.

As 2016–17 started, it was hoped by all at the club that their financial issues had been resolved when a party came forward offering to invest in the club. But before the season had even started, the backer had walked away – leaving a massive hole in the club's finance plans. It was the start of a traumatic season.

On the pitch, the season started well and Gosport were making steady headway in the top half of the table but in the background the club's financial issues began to take hold. The club missed a tax payment and HMRC issued a winding up order – the first of four Gosport would face during the season.

As players' wages were delayed, the majority of the first-team squad departed. Manager Alex Pike struggled to get a team together with the club embargoed by the winding up orders and he was dealt a major blow soon after Christmas when assistant manager Mick Catlin walked out, leaving Pike alone at the helm.

Throughout the whole season there had been talk of a takeover with several interested parties coming and going. Alongside this uncertainty off the pitch, the team struggled in the National League South. By February 2017 they lay six points adrift of safety and relegation appeared inevitable. Despite a late rally in March, highlighted by a 4–0 win over St Albans City and a 1–0 defeat of Bath City, the renewed form did not last and relegation was confirmed in the penultimate game of the season.

During the close season, a boardroom reorganisation took place. Mark Hook stepped down as chairman and both he and Alex Pike left the Board with Iain Sellstrom appointed chairman and Mark Adams OBE joining as Executive Officer.

The 2017–18 season started with the club still in turmoil. By September 2017, with Gosport lying at the bottom of the Southern League Premier Division having lost all of their opening seven games, Pike was sacked, bringing to a close his twelve-year stint as manager. A week later, he was replaced by his former assistant, Mick Catlin. On the same day, Executive Officer Mark Adams resigned.

=== Iain McInnes ownership ===
On 20 December 2017, it was announced that former Portsmouth chairman Iain McInnes had taken control of the club. Iain Sellstrom moved to the role of vice-chairman and Ray Stainton joined as chief executive officer.

Two days later, the club announced that Mick Catlin had departed after declining to serve as joint-manager alongside former manager Alex Pike. Pike was immediately installed as Catlin's replacement, returning after an absence of just 95 days.

Within days of Pike's return, new faces started to appear in the playing squad – both as signings and on loan from other clubs – but the new players failed to make much difference with Gosport shipping goals. In fact, it was six games into Pike's new reign before his side found the net and seven before they registered their first point.

Things failed to improve under Pike and he was sacked for the second time in a season on 15 March 2018 with the side still at the foot of the table. He had taken charge of 14 games since his return to the fold but had only secured two points – shipping 50 goals and scoring just nine. The club announced that temporary charge would be taken by striker Rowan Vine, assistant manager Louie Bell and scout Jay Keating.

On 27 March 2018, it was announced in the local press that HMRC had issued the club with a dissolution order after failing to submit their accounts for the financial year ending April 2016. Chairman Iain Mcinnes stated the issue was not his problem as it pre-dated his chairmanship. Nevertheless, the order from HMRC stated that should the club not supply the accounts by 20 May 2018, the company would be dissolved and all assets would pass to the Crown.

As the 2017–18 season drew to close, Gosport were locked in a relegation battle with Dunstable Town. After closing the gap to three points, Gosport then beat their relegation rivals in the penultimate game of the season to leapfrog them on goal difference. The last Saturday of the season proved a tense affair but The Borough survived thanks to a 4–0 win at St Neots Town. Nevertheless, it was a season fans would wish to forget with the team only managing five wins in 46 games, scoring only 41 goals and conceding 142 and playing 80 players.

On 25 May 2018, Ryan Northmore was appointed as the new first team manager but in another turn of fate, he was forced to quit less than a month later after his Colombian wife was refused entry into the UK and Northmore decided to put his family first.

Craig McAllister was appointed as first team manager on 25 June 2018, assisted by Matt Tubbs.

Unfortunately for the new management team, the 2018–19 season was little better for Boro' fans. Out of all cup competitions quickly, the league once again was a struggle. It again came down to the last game of the season with Gosport scraping a draw at Met Police enough to survive thanks to relegation rivals Basingstoke Town losing.

However, within days of the season ending, McAllister and Gibbs were sacked by Iain McInnes. Former player Lee Molyneaux was announced as the new manager in his first managerial appointment. Their best finish in recent years was 4th in the 23-24 Southern Premier League season. Their current manager is Glenn Howes.

== Stadium ==
Gosport Borough play their home games at Privett Park, (also known as the AEI Stadium) Privett Road, Gosport, Hampshire, PO12 3SX. The ground was opened in 1937 with the club taking up residence in 1944.

The ground is dominated by the Alan Chase stand (built when the ground opened in 1937) on the west side of the ground. This classic, old looking stand is set back from the pitch with the Press Box at the rear and the changing rooms beneath. The stand is constructed of wood on a brick lower level. It is covered and all seated but has a number of supporting pillars running across the front of it that may impede a spectators' view.

The dugouts are situated in front of the Alan Chase stand. Either side of the stand are the tea bar and the corporate suite housing for matchday hospitality.

Opposite the Alan Chase stand is the modern and smaller Harry Mizen Stand (built 2011). It has an unobstructed view of the pitch and disabled access. The Harry Mizen Stand seats 300 people.

Both ends of the ground are open, flat areas with no terracing. On the south side of the ground are the Trappers Bar and the clubhouse, which contains the boardroom, the club shop and the Boro Bar. At the north end of the ground are two mobile phone masts.

== Honours ==
- FA Trophy runners-up 2013–14
- Southern Premier League play-off winners 2012–13
- Southern League Division One South & West play-off winners 2011–12
- Wessex League champions 2006–07
- Wessex League Cup winners 1992–93
- Hampshire League champions 1945–46, 1976–77, 1977–78
- Hampshire Senior Cup winners 1987–88, 2014–15
- South Western Counties Pratten Cup winners 1977–78
- Russell Cotes Cup winners 1969–70, 2005–06, 2012–13, 2015–16
- Portsmouth League Champions 1944–45

== Officials ==
Gosport Borough Football Club Ltd (Company no 09548843)

- Chairman Iain McIness

Senior club officers

- Owner: Iain McInnes
- President: Jeremy Fox
- Chairman: Iain McInnes
- Directors: Craig Stainton, Dave Hurst
- Marketing Manager: Peter Harries
- Hospitality Management: Katt Pyle
- Health & Safety Lead: Craig Stainton
- Welfare Officer: Craig Stainton
- Club Shop Manager: Phil Churcher
- Head Steward: Helen Drew

Senior football management

- First team manager: Glenn Howes
- Assistant Manager: Mark Summerhill
- Coach: Zak Sharp
- Physiotherapist: Andy Hanley
- Kit Manager: John Abberley
- Lead GK Coach:
- Strength & Conditioning Coach: Martin Joy
- Analyst: Josh Bristow

Youth section

- Under 18 Manager: Zak Sharp

Behind the Scenes

- Matchday Announcer: Jeremy Fox
- Matchday PA Coordinator: Paul Davis
- Social Media: James McIntosh
- Match Reporter: James McIntosh & Connor Steele
- Photographers: Tom Phillips, Tahlia Karmy and Jack Aldridge
- Matchday Programme: Christopher Davis
- Matchday Commentary: James McIntosh

== Records ==
=== Gosport Borough Athletic FC ===
- Best FA Cup performance: Third qualifying round, 1947–48, 1954–55
- Best FA Amateur Cup performance: Third round, 1947–48, 1966–67
- Highest attendance: 4,770 Vs Pegasus in the FA Amateur Cup, 1953

=== Gosport Borough FC ===
- Highest league position: Conference South 6th in 2014-15
- Best FA Cup performance: First round, 2014–15
- Best FA Trophy performance: Runners–up, 2013–14
- Best FA Vase performance: Quarter-finals, 2003–04
- Record win: 19–1 Vs Widbrook United in the Portsmouth Senior Cup, 2016–17

== League record (since 2000) ==
- 2000–01: Wessex League – 8th
- 2001–02: Wessex League – 4th
- 2002–03: Wessex League – 2nd
- 2003–04: Wessex League – 3rd
- 2004–05: Wessex League – 4th
- 2005–06: Wessex League Division One – 5th
- 2006–07: Wessex League Premier Division – 1st (promoted)
- 2007–08: Southern League Division One South & West – 11th
- 2008–09: Southern League Division One South & West – 12th
- 2009–10: Southern League Division One South & West – 8th
- 2010–11: Southern League Division One South & West – 13th
- 2011–12: Southern League Division One South & West – 3rd (promoted via play-offs)
- 2012–13: Southern League Premier Division – 5th (promoted via play-offs)
- 2013–14: Football Conference South – 12th
- 2014–15: Football Conference South – 6th
- 2015–16: National League South – 9th
- 2016–17: National League South – 20th (relegated)
- 2017–18: Southern League Premier Division – 23rd (restructure of league not relegated)
- 2018-19: Southern League Premier Division South - 19th
- 2019-20: Southern League Premier Division South - 8th
- 2020-21: Southern League Premier Division South - 11th
- 2021-22: Southern League Premier Division South - 9th
- 2022-23: Southern League Premier Division South - 17th
- 2023-24: Southern League Premier Division South - 4th
- 2024-25: Southern League Premier Division South - 12th
- 2025-26: Southern League Premier Division South - 8th

== Domestic cup record (since 2000) ==
FA Cup

- 2000–01: First round qualifying replay – lost 3–4 on penalties to Thatcham Town (first tie 1–1, replay 1–1)
- 2001–02: Second round qualifying replay – lost 0–2 to Lewes (first tie 0–0)
- 2002–03: Third round qualifying – lost 1–3 to Bideford
- 2003–04: Preliminary round qualifying – lost 2–4 to Erith & Belvedere
- 2004–05: First round qualifying – lost 1–2 to Eastleigh
- 2005–06: Second round qualifying – lost 3–4 to Bath City
- 2006–07: Extra preliminary round – lost 0–1 to Carterton
- 2007–08: First round qualifying replay – lost 1–3 to Fleet Town (first tie 0–0)
- 2008–09: Third round qualifying – lost 0–1 to Dorchester Town
- 2009–10: Preliminary round – lost 0–1 to East Preston
- 2010–11: Preliminary round replay – lost 1–2 to Erith & Belvedere (first tie 0–0)
- 2011–12: Preliminary round – lost 1–2 to Moneyfields
- 2012–13: Fourth round qualifying replay – lost 1–2 Slough Town (first tie 0–0)
- 2013–14: Second round qualifying – lost 0–2 to Bath City
- 2014–15: First round – lost 3–6 to Colchester United
- 2015–16: Third round qualifying replay – lost 1–2 to Whitehawk (first tie 2–2)
- 2016–17: Second round qualifying replay – lost 2–3 to Weymouth
- 2017–18: Second round qualifying – lost 1–2 to Swindon Supermarine
- 2018-19: Second round qualifying - lost 2-3 to Ramsgate
- 2019-20: First round qualifying - lost 1-0 to Cirencester Town
- 2020-21: Second round qualifying - lost 1-3 to Hereford
- 2021-22: Second round qualifying - lost 2-0 to Yate Town
- 2022-23: Second round qualifying replay - lost 2-1 to Paulton Rovers (first tie 1-1)
- 2023-24: Third round qualifying replay - lost 4-2 to Welling United (first tie 2-2)
- 2024-25: Fourth round qualifying - lost 4-1 to Wealdstone
- 2025-26: Second round qualifying - lost 0-3 to Poole Town

FA Trophy

- 2000–01: Not entered (FA Vase)
- 2001–02: Not entered (FA Vase)
- 2002–03: Not entered (FA Vase)
- 2003–04: Not entered (FA Vase)
- 2004–05: Not entered (FA Vase)
- 2005–06: Not entered (FA Vase)
- 2007–08: Third round qualifying – lost 1–4 to Braintree Town
- 2008–09: First round qualifying – lost 2–3 to Andover
- 2009–10: Second round qualifying – lost 1–3 to Hitchin Town
- 2010–11: Preliminary round – lost 1–2 to Wimborne Town
- 2011–12: First round – lost 0–1 to Braintree Town
- 2012–13: Second round qualifying – lost 2–3 AFC Totton
- 2013–14: Finalists – lost 0–4 to Cambridge United
- 2014–15: Second round – lost 0–2 to Braintree Town
- 2015–16: Third round qualifying – lost 1–2 to Cirencester Town
- 2016–17: First round – lost 1–2 to AFC Sudbury
- 2017–18: Second round qualifying – lost 0–3 to Hartley Wintney
- 2018-19: First round qualifying - lost 1-2 to AFC Totton
- 2019-20: Third round qualifying replay- lost 2-3 to Bath Town (first tie 0-0)
- 2020-21: Third round qualifying - lost 2-1 to Dorchester Town
- 2021-22: Third round qualifying - lost 1-2 to Salisbury
- 2022-23: Third round qualifying - lost 3-0 to Bristol Manor Farm
- 2023-24: First round - lost 3-0 to Bognor Regis Town
- 2024-25: Third round - removed due to fielding an ineligible player against Tonbridge Angels
- 2025-26: Third round qualifying - lost 3-2 to Plymouth Parkway

FA Vase

- 2000–01: First round qualifying – lost 0–4 to Ashford Town (Middlesex)
- 2001–02: Second round qualifying replay – lost 2–4 to Andover (first tie 2–2)
- 2002–03: First round – lost 0–1 to Sandhurst Town
- 2003–04: Quarter finals – lost 0–3 to Bideford
- 2004–05: Third round – lost 0–1 to Didcot Town
- 2005–06: Second round qualifying – lost 0–1 to Greenwich Borough
- 2006–07: Second round – lost 1–4 to AFC Totton
- 2007–08 to date: Not entered (FA Trophy)
