= Stockbridge F.C. =

Coordinates: 51°06′54.95″N 1°29′21.33″W

- Full name: Stockbridge Football Club
- Nicknames: The Robins, Stocky
- Founded: 1894; 131 years ago
- Ground: The Recreation Ground, Stockbridge
- Capacity: 1,000 (100 seated)
- Chairman: Trevor Dance
- Manager: Tom Ridley
- League: Hampshire Premier League Senior Division
- 2025–26: Hampshire Premier League Senior Division, 15th of 16
- Website: www.stockbridgefc.co.uk
Home colours	Away colours

Stockbridge Football Club is an English football club based in Stockbridge, Hampshire. The club is affiliated to the Hampshire Football Association, and is a FA Charter Standard club. The club currently play in the Hampshire Premier League Senior Division.

== History ==
The club was established in 1894. They initially played on Common Down before moving to the Little Dean Field in London Road around 1910. The club played in the Faber League and the Sutton Scotney League during the 1920s, winning the Faber League Cup once and the Sutton Scotney League three times. In 1931 they joined Division Two of the Andover Junior League, which they won at the first attempt. The following season they won the Hants Junior B Cup, and in 1935 they won the North Hants Junior Cup. In 1936 they transferred to the Winchester League.

After World War II the club rejoined the Andover Junior League. They won Division One four times and the League Cup twice. However, in 1971 the club's ground was closed by Hampshire County Council in order to make improvements to a nearby road. The club played on the field of a local farmer until August 1978, when their current ground was opened. They won the league in their first season at the new ground, and again in 1981–82. In 1984 they were promoted to the North Hants Senior League, which they won in 1987–88.

In 1990–91, the club was promoted to the newly formed Division Three of the Hampshire League. After finishing second in 1992–93 they were promoted to Division Two, and a second-place finish in 1995–96 saw them promoted to Division One. A reorganisation in 1999 saw them placed in the Premier Division, where they remained for five seasons. At the end of the 2003–04 season, the club left the Hampshire league to join the newly formed Division Two of the Wessex League. This became Division One in 2006–07.

The club unfortunately lost its Wessex League status in 2014 when the nearby River Test broke its banks, flooding the pitch at the Recreation Ground. With no hope of completing their fixture list, the club were left with no option but to withdraw from the league. The Robins were subsequently accepted into the Hampshire Premier League for the following season.

The club made history in the 2018–19 season by entering the FA Vase at the first preliminary round with a home tie against the oldest club in Bristol, Roman Glass St George. The Robins lost the game 3–1, although the day was largely a success, a club record attendance saw over 150 supporters present who witnessed a little piece of history.

== Ground ==
Stockbridge play their home games at the Recreation Ground, High Street, Stockbridge, SO20 6EU.

The club moved into the ground in 1978. The ground has an all seater stand for 100 spectators, a licensed clubhouse with covered standing, floodlights and hard standing around three quarters of the pitch.

== Honours ==
=== League honours ===
- Hampshire League Division Two
  - Runners-up (1): 1995–96
- Hampshire League Division Three
  - Runners-up (1): 1992–93
- North Hants Senior League
  - Champions (1): 1987–88
  - Runners-up (1): 1984–85
- Andover Junior League
  - Champions (2):1979–80, 1981–82
  - Runners-up (1): 1983–84
- Andover Junior League Division Two
  - Champions (1): 1931–32

=== Cup Honours ===
- North Hants Senior Cup
  - Winners (3): 1991–92, 1998–99, 2005–06
- North Hants League Cup
  - Winners (1): 1990–91
  - Runners-up (3): 1984–85, 1985–86, 1989–90
- Andover League Open Cup
  - Winners (6): 1988–89, 1990–91, 1991–92, 2005–06, 2006–07, 2012–13
- North Hants Junior Cup
  - Winners (3): 1934–35, 1954–55, 1960–61
- Hants Junior A Cup
  - Runners-up (1): 1951–52
- Hants Junior B Cup
  - Winners (1): 1932–33
- Andover Midweek Cup
  - Winners (3): 1989–90, 1990–91, 1991–92
  - Runners-up (2): 1985–86, 1986–87
- South Wilts Charity Cup
  - Winners (2): 1979–80, 1980–81
- Bessie Savage Cup
  - Runners-up (1): 1979–80
- Fred Druce Cup
  - Winners (2): 1984–85, 1986–87

== Records ==
- Highest League Position: 7th in Wessex League Division One 2006–07
- Best FA Vase performance: First Qualifying Round, 2018–19, 2019–20
