= Liss Athletic F.C. =

Amateur football club based in Liss, England

Coordinates: 51°02′24.65″N 0°53′17.83″W

Liss Athletic
- Full name: Liss Athletic Football Club
- Nickname: Blues
- Founded: 1962
- Ground: Newman Collard Park, Liss
- Chairman: Peter Storrie
- Manager: Mark Glazier
- League: Hampshire Premier League Senior Division
- 2025–26: Hampshire Premier League Senior Division, 6th of 16

Liss Athletic F.C. is an amateur football club based in Liss, near Petersfield, in England. The club is affiliated to the Hampshire Football Association and is an England Accredited club They are currently members of the Hampshire Premier League Senior Division.

== History ==
Liss Athletic Football Club was established in 1962. The club joined Division Four of the Hampshire League for the start of the 1975–76 campaign, and were immediately promoted to Division Three when they finished third.

Further promotion followed in the 1979–80 season, when the top two teams expanded and Liss were placed in Division Two, where the club remained for three seasons before leaving the Hampshire League at the end of 1982–83.

The club returned to the Hampshire League for the 1987–88 season, placed into Division Two, where they remained until 1994–95, promoted to Division One as champions.

Liss remained in the top tier of the Hampshire League until the end of the 2003–04 campaign, after which they joined the newly created Division Two of the Wessex League, which then became Division One after two seasons, until the end of the 2007–08 campaign.

Liss joined the newly formed Hampshire Premier League - which had been founded a season earlier, and were twice reprieved from relegation in finished bottom of the table in consecutive seasons of 2010-11 and 11-12 - with the club's best finish in recent years in 2015–16, when they finished fourth.

The same season saw Liss reach the League Cup final, defeated 2-0 by Hamble Club at AFC Portchester - while the reserves brought silverware by completing the Combination (East) League and Cup double.

After two abandoned seasons owing to the Covid pandemic, 2021/22 saw a new-look Liss Athletic finish just above the relegation spots under manager, Mark Glazier, with opportunity handed to a number of youth team players, where the club operates a side at every age group as part of its growing set-up.

Twelve months later, the side progressed to mid-table, while reaching its first League Cup semi-final for six years.

Continued on-field improvements saw the club rank fifth in 2023/24 – their highest HPFL finish for eight years.

Year-on-year progression continued into 2024/25 - the reserves brought home the Hampshire Combination & Development League Cup with penalty shoot-out victory over Downton at Westleigh Park in April - a first silverware for nine years.

Meanwhile, the first team won the George Mason Memorial Shield, beating Denmead at AFC Portchester to go with a runners-up finish in the Senior Division.

The Reserves gained promotion as runners-up of the Hampshire Combination Division One in 2025/26, going on an unbeaten run until March, while the first team made it three consecutive top six finishes in the Hampshire Premier League.

== Ground ==
Liss Athletic play their home games at Newman Collard Park, Hill Brow Road, Liss, Hampshire, GU33 7LE.

== Honours ==
- Hampshire League Division Two:
  - Champions (1): 1994/95
- George Mason Memorial Shield
  - Winners (1): 2024/25
- Hampshire Combination & Development League
  - Cup Winners (1): 2024/25
- Hampshire Premier League Combination East
  - Champions (1): 2015/16
- Hampshire Premier League Combination
  - Cup Winners (1): 2015/16

== Records ==
- Highest league position: 5th in Wessex League Division Two 2005–06
- Record victory (2): 11-0 v Whitehill & Bordon Development, Aldershot Intermediate Cup, October 2024 | v Sway, HPFL Senior Division, May 2025
- Record defeat: 2-14 v Colden Common, September 2019
- Record attendance: 414 v Pompey Legends, May 2024
