= Colden Common F.C. =

Association football club in England

Colden Common
- Full name: Colden Common Football Club
- Nickname: The Commoners
- Founded: 1898 (re-formed 1956)
- Ground: Oakwood Park, SO21 2ED Otterbourne
- Chairman: Dave Riddell
- Manager: Steve King
- League: Wessex League Division One
- 2025–26: Wessex League Division One, 3rd of 22
- Website: https://www.coldencommonfc.club/
Home colours

Colden Common Football Club is a football club based in Otterbourne, near Winchester, Hampshire, England. The club is affiliated to the Hampshire Football Association. The club is an FA Charter Standard club. The club are currently members of the Wessex League Division One.

== History ==
The club was founded in 1898 and re-formed in 1956, supported by the Banford family. Their Sunday league team, started in 1973, won numerous trophies before moving into Saturday football, and by the 1986–87 season had progressed to Hampshire League Division One. In 1992, they won the Hampshire League championship, a feat repeated in 1996, and won the Southampton Senior Cup in 1994. When the Hampshire League was reorganised in 1999, the club was placed in the Premier Division, at what was then level 9 of the English football league system, but was administratively relegated two years later because the ground failed to meet Premier Division standards.

In 2004, they won the "double" of the Division One title, thus earning promotion to the Wessex League, and Hampshire Intermediate Cup. Unable to apply for admission to Wessex League Division Two because of the requirement for floodlights, Colden Common were placed in Division Three, and went on to win the division title. Having finished their programme, it was still possible for Hayling United to overtake them by winning their last four games with a 19-goal swing, but they were unable to do so. In 2007, they withdrew from the Wessex League, because their inability to develop their home ground made it impossible for them to progress up the leagues, and joined the Hampshire Premier League. They won their second consecutive Hampshire Premier League title in 2010.

2021-22 brought The Stallions the Hampshire Premier League Senior Division title with a late penalty scored by Ben White away at Hayling United in their final game of the season to earn a 1–1 draw and the title-winning point, with CCFC becoming the first team to have won the Hampshire Premier League Senior Division three times. In 2022–23, Colden Common defended their league title with two games to play, completing the 'treble' of league title, the HPFL League Cup, and the Hampshire FA Saturday Trophy (formerly the 'Intermediate Cup').

== Ground ==
Colden Common play their home games at Oakwood Park Recreational Ground, Oakwood Avenue, Otterbourne, SO21 2ED.

== Notable former players ==
England international Steve Guppy played for Colden Common at the beginning of his career, before joining Wycombe Wanderers.

== Honours ==
=== League honours ===
- Wessex League Division Three
  - Winners (1): 2003–04
- Hampshire Premier League
  - Winners (4): 2008–09, 2009–10, 2021–2022, 2022–23
- Hampshire League
  - Winners (2): 1991–92, 1995–96
- Hampshire League Division One
  - Winners (1): 2004–05

=== Cup honours ===
- Hampshire FA Saturday Trophy
  - Winners (1): 2022–23
- Southampton Senior Cup
  - Winners (1): 1993–94
- Andover Senior Cup
  - Winners (1): 2002–03
- Hampshire Intermediate Cup Final
  - Winners (2): 2012–13, 2022–23
- Hampshire Premier League Cup
  - Winners (1): 2012–13
