= Locks Heath F.C. =

Association football club in England

Coordinates: 50°51′00.76″N 1°15′18.34″W

Locks Heath
- Full name: Locks Heath Football Club
- Founded: 1894
- Ground: Locks Heath Recreation Ground
- Chairman: Mark Watson
- Manager: Jon Whitfield
- League: Hampshire Premier League Senior Division
- 2024–25: Hampshire Premier League Senior Division, 3rd of 16
Home colours	Away colours

Locks Heath Football Club is a football club based in Fareham suburb of Locks Heath, Hampshire, England. The club is affiliated to the Hampshire Football Association. The club is an FA Charter Standard club. They won the Hampshire League title in 1991. They are currently members of the Hampshire Premier League Senior Division and play their home games at Locks Heath Recreation Ground, Warsash Road, Fareham.

== History ==
Locks Heath was founded in 1894 but prior to that played as St Johns Chapel team against other local church and chapel teams. In the 1983–84 season they joined the Hampshire League, in Division three and within three seasons were in the top division, finishing as Runners up in 1986–87. The club went on to win the Hampshire league in the 1990–91 season. In the 2005–06 season, they won the Wessex League Second Division title and were promoted to Wessex League Division 1 for 2006–07, finishing in fourth place, before joining the Hampshire Premier League as founder members.

On 27 July 2011, Locks Heath Football Club was awarded the coveted FA Charter Standard Award.

The 2012–13 season saw the club become champions of the Hampshire Premier League for the first time in their history. However the club was refused promotion to the Wessex League, as Locks Heath Recreation Ground (a public open space, owned by Fareham Borough Council) could not be developed to the standards required by the league. In an effort to avoid future restrictions on club promotion, chairman Douglas Leask finalised a ground share agreement in late 2013, for the club's first team, with Gosport Borough FC, who play at Privett Park Seven seasons of flirting with relegation on occasion, including the 2019/20 season which when suspended and annulled ‘The Locks’ were bottom of the table, followed. David Fuge, who led Locks to the title in 2012/13 returned to the club from US Portsmouth at the beginning of the 2020/21 season.

During the 2023/2024, the 1st Team finished Runners-up in the Hampshire Premier Football League.

== Ground ==
Locks Heath play home matches at the Locks Heath Recreation Ground, Warsash Road, Fareham, PO14 4JX. The recreation ground is owned by Fareham Borough Council.

Locks Heath Recreation Ground has been the club's home for more than 70 years. The club is a section of the Locks Heath Sports and Social Club which has a licensed club house on the site. During the summer months the recreation ground is used by Locks Heath Cricket Club

The part of the Recreation Ground given over to football has a semi-permanent barrier around the pitch, and floodlights, some which are removed at the end of each football season so that the ground can be used for cricket.

== Honours ==
- Wessex League Division 2
  - Winners: 2005–06
- Hampshire Premier League'
  - Winners: 2012–13
- Hampshire League Premier Division'
  - Runners-up: 1999–2000
- Hampshire League Division 1'
  - Winners: 1990–91
  - Runners-up: 1986–87
- Hampshire League Division 2'
  - Winners: 1995–96
  - Runners-up: 1985–86
- Hampshire League Division 3'
  - Runners-up: 1983–84
- Hampshire Football Association Intermediate Cup
  - Winners: 1983-84 and 1994–95
- Hampshire Football Association Junior 'A' Cup
  - Winners: 1957–58
- Hampshire Football Association Junior 'B' Cup
  - Winners: 1956–57

== Records ==
- Highest League Position: 4th in Wessex League Division One 2006–07
- Fewest Ever Losses in a Season: in 2012/13 Season, Locks Heath lost only 1 game en route to winning the Hampshire Premier League, a Record that is still held to this day.

== Notable former players ==
1. Players that have played/managed in the football league or any foreign equivalent to this level (i.e. fully professional league).
2. Players with full international caps.
- (England) Colin Sullivan
- (England) Steve Boden
