= Hayling United F.C. =

Association football club in England

Coordinates: 50°47′48.48″N 0°58′22.18″W

Hayling United
- Full name: Hayling United Football Club
- Nickname: Humbugs
- Founded: 1884 (as Hayling Island)
- Ground: Hayling College, Hayling Island
- Manager: Steve Deller and Rich Meli
- League: Hampshire Premier League Division One
- 2025–26: Hampshire Premier League Division One, 11th of 14
Home colours	Away colours

Hayling United Football Club is an football club based on Hayling Island in Hampshire, England. The club is affiliated to the Hampshire Football Association, and is an FA Charter Standard club. The Humbugs were founded in 1884 as Hayling Island, but changed their name in the early seventies to the present name.

The club currently play in the Hampshire Premier League Division One.

== History ==
=== Formation and early years ===
There is no definitive date for the founding of the club but there are numerous mentions of matches being played in 1884 including one against a team that went on to become Portsmouth Football Club.

Playing in the Portsmouth side that day under the name of A C Smith was a struggling local doctor who went on to become the creator of Sherlock Holmes as Arthur Conan Doyle.

Teams under the name of Hayling Island continued to play in the Waterlooville & District League until the club joined the Portsmouth League in the early fifties.

From there some 40 years later they progressed to the Hampshire League where their first fixture was in the north Hampshire (nearly Berkshire) village of Ecchinswell, the home of Sir Andrew Lloyd Webber who, it was suggested at the time, was sponsoring the club. By this time the club were playing as Hayling United having changed their name in 1999.

=== Wessex League success ===
In 2004 Hayling joined the newly-formed Wessex League Division Three. After finishing runners-up in back-to-back seasons, they achieved promotion to Division One. Hayling lost just five games in their debut season at this level, scoring a club record 116 goals in the process, and were crowned champions of the division.

A six-season stint in the Wessex Premier League followed, where Hayling achieved their highest-ever finish in the 2008 season and also took part in the early rounds of the FA Cup.

Defeats to Romsey and Blackfield & Langley in 2009 and 2010 respectively brought a premature end to Hayling's FA Cup dreams, but they would have more joy the following season. After holding Bridport to a 2–2 draw at St Mary's Field, Hayling's hopes of progression were wiped out thanks to a 2–0 home defeat in the replay.

The Humbugs fared better in the FA Vase, especially during the 2012–13 season. Having successfully navigated a tough first-qualifying round replay against Verwood Town, Hayling then beat local rivals AFC Portchester in the following stage to set up a first-round proper clash away to Cadbury Heath. The Humbugs struck twice in south Gloucestershire but lost 3–2, bringing a bitter end to an encouraging cup run.

=== Back-to-back relegations ===
Throughout the 2012-13 Wessex Premier Division campaign, Hayling United were issued warnings over the state of their ground by the league. The authority's argument was that the College Ground did not meet the Grade F grade required for the Wessex Premier league as the ground was not fully enclosed by a six-foot-high perimeter fence. However, due to the fact that the Humbugs only rented the field from the Hayling College, installing the fence was harder than it first appeared.

After several negotiations, it was decided that a removable fence would be placed at one of the field's entrances, and would be installed on match days by club representatives. Despite finding a temporary solution, Hayling were still demoted to the Wessex Division One at the end of the 2012–13 season and a points deduction ensured they would be relegated to the Hampshire Premier League Division One ahead of the 2014-15 campaign.

=== On the rise again ===
After steadying the ship with a respectable seventh-placed finish, Hayling achieved promotion back to the Hampshire Premier League Senior Division by finishing runners-up in 2015–16. The following season they won the League Cup.

== Notable former players ==
Hayling's most famous 'son' is former Chelsea player Bobby Tambling, recently overtaken by Frank Lampard as the Blues' all-time record goalscorer. He played for Hayling in his youth days and managed the club for a spell in the 1990s, before turning out a couple of times in the No 11 shirt despite being in his fifties.

== Performance by season ==
Season	Division	Position	Pld	W	D	L	F	A	Pts	Notes
1991-92	Hampshire League Division 3	26	11	8	7	41	35	41	6/14	Promoted
1992-93	Hampshire League Division 2	34	12	10	12	58	45	57	9/18	
1993-94	Hampshire League Division 2	32	21	7	4	71	26	70	2/17	Promoted
1994-95	Hampshire League Division 1	38	12	14	12	51	45	50	9/20	
1995-96	Hampshire League Division 1	38	21	6	11	58	42	69	7/20	
1996-97	Hampshire League Division 1	40	19	6	15	65	59	63	9/21	
1997-98	Hampshire League Division 1	38	10	8	20	51	100	38	7/20	
1998-99	Hampshire League Division 1	36	11	6	19	40	60	39	15/19	Competition reorganised
1999-00	Hampshire League Premier Division	42	19	11	12	59	50	65	9/22	Demoted
2000-01	Hampshire League Division 1	30	17	6	7	58	28	57	4/16	
2001-02	Hampshire League Division 1	28	17	5	6	56	31	56	3/15	
2002-03	Hampshire League Division 1	28	20	3	5	86	29	63	1/15	Ineligible for promotion
2003-04	Hampshire League Division 1	26	13	4	9	42	32	43	5/14	Competition absorbed by Wessex League
2004-05	Wessex League Division 3	38	26	8	4	104	30	86	2/20	Promoted
2005-06	Wessex League Division 2	42	27	8	7	99	39	89	2/22	Divisions renamed
2006-07	Wessex League Division 1	36	27	4	5	116	32	85	1/19	Promoted
2007-08	Wessex League Premier Division	44	15	9	20	66	101	54	12/23	
2008-09	Wessex League Premier Division	42	11	8	23	66	96	41	16/22	
2009-10	Wessex League Premier Division	42	11	11	20	51	84	44	15/22	
2010-11	Wessex League Premier Division	42	9	4	29	69	130	31	21/22	
2011-12	Wessex League Premier Division	42	10	8	24	59	104	38	18/22	
2012-13	Wessex League Premier Division	40	13	5	22	74	112	44	16/21	Demoted
2013-14	Wessex League Division 1	30	6	4	20	47	106	22	14/16	Left competition
2014-15	Hampshire Premier League Division 1	20	7	3	10	51	42	24	7/11	
2015-16	Hampshire Premier League Division 1	18	14	1	3	59	19	43	2/10	Promoted
2016-17	Hampshire Premier League Senior Division	28	14	4	10	63	47	46	6/15	
2017-18	Hampshire Premier League Senior Division	30	12	7	11	68	72	43	10/16	
2018-19	Hampshire Premier League Senior Division	30	10	3	17	48	74	32	11/16	
2019-20	Hampshire Premier League Senior Division									Season abandoned due to Covid-19
2020-21	Hampshire Premier League Senior Division									Season abandoned due to Covid-19
2021-22	Hampshire Premier League Senior Division	30	13	3	14	57	65	42	8/16	
2022-23	Hampshire Premier League Senior Division	32	7	10	15	38	75	31	14/17	
2023-24	Hampshire Premier League Senior Division	30	10	2	18	43	69	32	15/16	Relegated
2024-25	Hampshire Premier League Division 1	26	10	8	8	56	55	38	6/14	
2025-26	Hampshire Premier League Division 1	26	7	5	14	45	61	26	11/14	
2026-27	Hampshire Premier League Division 1									

== Honours ==
Wessex League

- Division 1 Champions (1) 2006–07, Runners-up (1) 2005–06
- Division 3 Runners-up (1) 2004–05

Hampshire Premier League

- Division 1 Runners-up (1) 2015–16
- League Cup Winners (1) 2016-17

Hampshire League

- Division 1 Champions (1) 2002–03
- Division 2 Runners-up (1) 1993-94
