= Blackfield & Langley F.C. =

English football club

Coordinates: 50°49′31″N 1°22′21″W

Blackfield & Langley
- Full name: Blackfield and Langley Football Club
- Nickname: The Watersiders
- Founded: 1935
- Ground: Gang Warily Rec, Blackfield
- Capacity: 2,500 (180 seated)
- Chairman: Stuart Barker
- Manager: Vacant
- League: Hampshire Premier League Senior Division
- 2025–26: Wessex League Division One, 21st of 22 (relegated)
Home colours	Away colours

Blackfield & Langley Football Club is a football club based in the village of Blackfield, near Southampton, England. Affiliated to the Hampshire Football Association, they are currently members of the Hampshire Premier League Senior Division and play at the Gang Warily Recreation Ground. Their local rivals are Fawley and Hythe & Dibden.

== History ==
The club was established in 1935. During World War II they played in the Hythe & District League, and following the war the club joined the Southampton League. After winning Junior Division One in 1945–46, they moved up to the West Division of the Senior section. In their first season they won the West Division and the Southampton Senior Cup. In 1949 the club joined Division Three East of the Hampshire League. Despite winning the division in 1951–52, they were not promoted, and were Division Three West runners-up the following season. The club were runners-up again in 1954–55 and were placed in Division Three following league restructuring at the end of the season.

Blackfield & Langley were Division Three runners-up in 1955–56 and this time were promoted to Division Two. However, after finishing second-from-bottom of the division in 1959–60, the club were relegated back to Division Three. League restructuring in 1968 saw them moved into Division Three West, before further reorganisation in 1971 led to the club becoming members of Division Four. A third-place finish in 1974–75 resulted in promotion to Division Three, but they were relegated back to Division Four after finishing bottom of the table in 1978–79. When Division Four was abolished in 1980, the club were moved up to Division Three.

The 1981–82 season saw Blackfield & Langley finish as runners-up in Division Three, earning promotion to Division One. After missing out on promotion to Division One on goal difference in 1983–84, they went on to win the Division Two title in 1984–85 and were promoted to the league's top division. They were Division One runners-up in 1988–89 and again in 1991–92 and 1993–94. They went on to win Division One and the Southampton Senior Cup in 1997–98, but were unable to take promotion due to their ground not meeting the Wessex League requirements. However, after upgrade work was complete, a third-place finish in the renamed Premier Division in 1999–2000 was enough to secure promotion. When the Wessex League gained extra divisions in 2004, the club were relegated to the new Division Two, having finished second-from-bottom of the league in 2003–04. Division Two was subsequently renamed Division One in 2006.

Blackfield & Langley were Division One runners-up in 2008–09, earning promotion to the Premier Division. In 2012–13 the club won the Premier Division, but did not apply for promotion to the Southern League due to the cost of upgrading their ground. They won the Hampshire FA's Russell Cotes Cup in 2014–15, beating Horndean 2–0 in the final. The club were Premier Division champions in 2017–18, earning promotion to Division One South of the Southern League. The 2018–19 season saw the club win the Division One South title, earning promotion to the Premier Division South. However, they resigned from the Southern League the following season and returned to the Premier Division of the Wessex League.

== Ground ==
The club moved to the Gang Warily Recreation Ground after it was identified as a suitable site for a ground that could be upgraded to Wessex League standard. Located next to the Fawley Refinery, it currently has a capacity of 2,500, of which 180 is seated.

== Honours ==
- Southern League
  - Division One South champions 2018–19
- Wessex League
  - Premier Division champions 2012–13, 2017–18
- Hampshire League
  - Premier Division champions 1997–98
  - Division Two champions 1984–85
  - Division Three West champions 1951–52
- Southampton League
  - West Division champions 1946–47
- Southampton Junior League
  - Division One champions 1945–46
- Southampton Senior Cup
  - Winners 1946–47, 1997–98
- Russell Cotes Cup
  - Winners 2014–15

== Records ==
- Best FA Cup performance: Fourth qualifying round, 2012–13
- Best FA Trophy performance: Second qualifying round, 2019–20
- Best FA Vase performance: Fourth round, 2012–13, 2013–14

== See also ==
- Blackfield & Langley F.C. players
- Blackfield & Langley F.C. managers
