= Farnborough North End F.C. =

Association football club in England

Coordinates: 51°16′47.71″N 0°48′07.34″W

Farnborough North End
- Full name: Farnborough North End Football Club
- Nickname: North End
- Founded: 1967
- Ground: Krooner Park, Camberley
- Chairman: Stephen Goble
- Manager: Athletic Steve Lloyd. Development Tom Collins.
- League: Guildford & Woking Alliance Premier Division
- 2025/26: Guildford & Woking Alliance League
Home colours	Away colours

Farnborough North End Football Club is a football club based in Farnborough, Hampshire. They are currently members of the Surrey County Intermediate League (Western) Premier Division and play at Camberley Town's Krooner Park.

== History ==
The club was originally formed as Farnborough Covenanters in 1967, and initially played in the Woking and District League. The 1980–81 season saw the club win the Division One title, and join the top division of the Woking and District league. The club was then renamed Covies to distinguish itself from the church youth group, which they had originally been formed from. They then joined Division three of the Surrey Intermediate League (Western) for the start of the 1982–83 campaign. The club progressed through the league gaining promotion to the top division at the end of the 1987–88 competition when they finished as Runners up in Division Two.

After nine seasons in the Surrey County Intermediate League they joined the newly formed Division Three of the Hampshire League in 1991. In 1998 the club adopted its current name and moved to a new ground at Farnborough Gate, Ringwood Road. The following season saw them placed in Division Two as part of league re-organisation. In 2000–01 they won the division and were promoted to Division One. The club then finished as runners up the next season, but were not promoted to the premier division.

The club again finished as runners up in Division one of the Hampshire league in the 2002–03 campaign, but this time they moved to the newly established Division Three of the Wessex League. Their first season in the Wessex League saw the club, move to the Cody Sports & Social Club in February 2005 and gain promotion to Division Two after finishing third. The 2007–08 season saw the club make their debut in the FA Vase in the First qualifying Round, but got beat by Chalfont St Peter 3–1.

In 2010 they switched to Division One of the Combined Counties League, but their first season was a disaster as they finished bottom, and lost their home ground halfway through the season. The club were then relegated and joined the Surrey Elite Intermediate League, and at a new home ground of Southwood Playing Fields at Rushmoor Community. However the club were relegated again after only collecting three points in the whole season. The club was then placed in the Surrey County Intermediate League (Western) Premier Division for the start of the 2012–13 campaign.

Currently the club runs one side in the Surrey County Intermediate League (Western) Premier Division and one side in the Guildford & Woking Alliance League.

== Ground ==
Initially the club played at Knellwood (also known as the King George V playing fields). Whilst members of the Surrey Intermediate League, the club played at Cove Green and then at Queens Road in North Camp (the former home of Farnborough Town) for around 10 years. In 1998 they moved to Farnborough Gate on Ringwood Road, before moving to the Cody Sports & Social Club in February 2005. Then due to new landlords they moved to nearby Rushmoor Community FC in 2009/10 Season after coming bottom of the Combined Counties. Spending two seasons at Rushmoor they then moved to Cove FC. Since 2023 Farnborough North End have two teams who play currently in the Guilford & Woking Alliance League. The Athletic side play at Krooner Park in Camberley. The Development side ground share with Frimley Green FC.

== Honours ==
=== League honours ===
- Runners Up Surrey County Western Premier Division 2016–17
- Hampshire League Division One
  - Runners-up (2): 2001–02, 2003–04
- Hampshire League Division Two
  - Champions (1): 2000–01
- Surrey County Intermediate League Division Two
  - Runners-up (1): 1987–88
- Surrey County Intermediate League Division Three
  - Runners-up (1): 1983–84
- Woking and District Football League Division One
  - Champions (1): 1980–81
- Woking and District Football League Division Two
  - Runners-up (1): 1976–77
- Woking and District Football League Division Three
  - Runners-up (1): 1969–70

=== Cup honours ===
- Surrey Intermediate Cup Runners up 2016–17.
- Aldershot FA Intermediate Cup Runners up 2016–17.
- Hampshire Intermediate Cup
  - Winners (1): 2004–05
  - Runners-up (1): 1989–90
- Hampshire League Division Three Cup
  - Runners-up (1): 1995–96
- Surrey County Intermediate League Cup
  - Runners-up (1): 1989–90
- Snowy Cup
  - Winners (1): 1978–79
- Southern Railwayman's Orphanage Cup
  - Winners (1): 1976–77

== Records ==
- Highest League Position: 3rd in Wessex League Division One 2007–08
- FA Vase best performance: First round 2009–10
