= Hampshire Premier League =

Association football league in England

- Founded: 2007; 19 years ago
- Country: England
- Divisions: 2
- Number of clubs: 17 (Senior Division); 16 (Division One)
- Level on pyramid: Level 11 (Senior Division)
- Promotion to: Wessex League
- Relegation to: Aldershot & District League; Basingstoke & District League; Mid Solent League; Isle of Wight League; Southampton League
- Domestic cup(s): Hampshire FA Trophy; Hampshire Premier League Challenge Cup; George Mason Memorial Shield
- Current champions: Locks Heath
- Most championships: Colden Common (5 titles)
- Website: Official website

The Hampshire Premier League or uhlsport Hampshire Premier League, for sponsorship reasons, is a football competition based in Hampshire, England. The league was formed in 2007 and currently consists of a 'Senior Division' of 16 teams and a Division One of 14 teams.

== History ==
The competition was formed in 2007, mostly by Wessex League clubs unable to meet the ground grading criteria. A.F.C. Stoneham were the inaugural champions.

A year later, it was announced that the league was in talks with the Hampshire League 2004 about merging the two leagues into a new competition which it was hoped would officially gain Step 7 status, and although the merger did not take place, the status of the Hampshire Premier League at Step 7 of the National League System (or level 11 of the overall English football league system) was confirmed by The Football Association on 15 May 2008. The Hampshire League then appealed to the FA, claiming it should gain similar status, but the appeal was rejected.

The Hampshire League 2004 was dissolved at the end of the 2012–13 season, with the majority of the teams joining the newly created Division One of the Hampshire Premier League.

Bush Hill won the Senior Division in 2019–20, subsequently changing their name to Millbrook and taking their place in the Wessex League for the 2020–21 season.

After two seasons of unfulfilled campaigns due to the covid pandemic, Colden Common's late charge ensured The Stallions took the Senior Division title on the last day of 2021–22. Meanwhile, QK Southampton triumphed in Division One South East, with Andover New Street Swifts claiming the Division One North crown.

The League removed the regionality of its second tier for the start of 2022–23, with teams from the previous South East and North forming a unified Division One. The Supplementary Shield, brought in as an additional competition during the pandemic and won by Hook in 2021–22, was renamed The George Mason Memorial Shield, in honour of the league's former chairman.

== Member clubs 2026–27 ==
=== Senior Division ===
- Bishops Waltham Dynamos
- Blackfield & Langley
- Broughton
- Crofton Saints
- Denmead
- Hook
- Liphook United
- Liss Athletic
- Locks Heath
- Meon Milton
- Moneyfields Reserves
- AFC Netley
- Overton United
- AFC Shirley
- Southsea Sports (formerly Harvest FC)
- United Services Portsmouth
- Whitehill & Bordon

=== Division One ===
- Andover Town
- BTC Southampton
- Hayling United
- Headley United
- Hedge End Town
- Horndean United
- Lyndhurst
- Mob Albion
- North Waltham
- Nursling & Shirley (formerly QK Southampton)
- Paulsgrove
- Sporting Wessex
- Stockbridge
- Sway
- Twentyten
- Whiteley Wanderers

== List of champions ==
Season	Senior Division Champions	Division One Champions	League Cup Winners
2007–08	AFC Stoneham	N/A	Team Solent
2008–09	Colden Common	N/A	Paulsgrove
2009–10	Colden Common	N/A	AFC Stoneham
2010–11	Liphook United	N/A	Team Solent
2011–12	Liphook United	N/A	Liphook United
2012–13	Locks Heath	N/A	Colden Common
2013–14	Baffins Milton Rovers	Bush Hill	Baffins Milton Rovers
2014–15	Hamble Club	Infinity	AFC Stoneham
2015–16	Baffins Milton Rovers	Andover Lions	Hamble Club
2016–17	Bush Hill	Four Marks	Hayling United
2017–18	Paulsgrove	Netley Central Sports	Sway
2018–19	Bush Hill	Lyndhurst	Infinity
2019–20	Season abandoned due to COVID-19 pandemic.		
2020–21	Season abandoned due to COVID-19 pandemic.		
2021–22	Colden Common	Andover New Street Swifts (North) & QK Southampton (SE)	Sway
2022–23	Colden Common	Infinity	Colden Common
2023–24	Liphook United	Meon Milton	Bishops Waltham Dynamos
2024–25	Colden Common	Broughton	Crofton Saints
2025–26	Locks Heath	AFC Netley	AFC Shirley
