= Hampshire Football Association =

Governing body of football in the county of Hampshire, England

- Hampshire FA logo
- Formation: 1887
- Purpose: Football association
- Headquarters: Winklebury Football Complex
- Location: Basingstoke
- Coordinates: 51.267931°N 1.111906°W
- President: J. Benfield
- Website: http://www.hampshirefa.com/

The Hampshire Football Association, also known as Hampshire FA, is the governing body of football in the county of Hampshire, England. It also oversees the Isle of Wight Football Association.
