= 2013–14 Wessex Football League =

Wessex Football League
- Season: 2013–14

The 2013–14 Wessex Football League (known as the Sydenhams Football League (Wessex) for sponsorship reasons) was the 28th season of the Wessex Football League since its establishment in 1986.

The league consisted of two divisions: the Premier Division and Division One. Both divisions this season consisted of an extra team than the previous season – the Premier Division had 22 teams and Division One had 17 teams.

== Premier Division ==
Wessex Football League Premier Division
- Champions: Sholing
- Relegated: Downton; Romsey Town
- Matches: 462
- Goals: 1,671 (3.62 per match)
- Top goalscorer: 39 – Warren Bentley (Alresford Town)
- Biggest home win: Newport IOW 12–0 Christchurch, (26 April 2014)
- Biggest away win: Fawley 0–7 Alresford Town, (28 September 2013); Fawley 0–7 Winchester City, (7 August 2013
- Highest scoring: Sholing 12–1 Downton, (28 December 2013)

The Premier Division featured 22 teams, increased from the 21 teams which competed in the previous season, after Alton Town were transferred to the Combined Counties Football League, Hayling United were demoted to Division One due to ground grading problems, and New Milton Town were relegated.

Four teams joined the division:

- Brockenhurst, champions of Division One.
- Sholing, having resigned from the Southern League.
- Whitchurch United, runners-up in Division One.
- Winchester City, relegated from the Southern League.
- GE Hamble F.C. changed their name back to Folland Sports F.C.
- Clubs that applied for promotion to Step 4 were: A.F.C. Portchester, Newport IOW, Sholing and Winchester City.

=== League table ===
Pos	Team	Pld	W	D	L	GF	GA	GD	Pts	Promotion or relegation
1	Sholing (C, P)	42	33	5	4	134	29	+105	104	Promotion to 2014–15 Southern Football League
2	Alresford Town	42	31	4	7	125	52	+73	97	
3	Folland Sports	42	27	7	8	100	48	+52	85 (Note: Folland Sports were deducted three points for fielding an ineligible player against Lymington Town on 2 November.)	
4	Newport (IOW)	42	25	9	8	105	47	+58	84	
5	Winchester City	42	25	6	11	93	41	+52	81	
6	Blackfield & Langley	42	23	9	10	81	57	+24	78	
7	Bemerton Heath Harlequins	42	22	5	15	99	65	+34	71	
8	AFC Portchester	42	21	13	8	86	43	+43	70 (Note: Moneyfields and AFC Portchester each had six points deducted for fielding an ineligible player.)	
9	Moneyfields	42	21	10	11	75	53	+22	67	
10	Fareham Town	42	18	8	16	78	81	−3	62	
11	Brockenhurst	42	17	8	17	72	82	−10	59	
12	Hamworthy United	42	16	9	17	78	78	0	57	
13	Whitchurch United	42	16	7	19	57	69	−12	55	
14	Lymington Town	42	15	5	22	71	99	−28	50	
15	Bournemouth	42	12	7	23	66	89	−23	43	
16	Christchurch	42	11	7	24	56	112	−56	40	
17	Horndean	42	10	7	25	55	95	−40	37	
18	Totton & Eling	42	12	0	30	54	117	−63	36	
19	Verwood Town	42	8	10	24	45	78	−33	34	
20	Fawley	42	7	9	26	49	108	−59	30	
21	Downton (R)	42	6	8	28	49	121	−72	26	Relegation to Wessex Division One
22	Romsey Town (R)	42	6	7	29	43	107	−64	24 (Note: Romsey Town had one point deducted for fielding an ineligible player.)	Relegation to Wessex Division One

Updated to match(es) played on 3 May 2014. Source: http://full-time.thefa.com/Index.do?league=274386
Rules for classification: 1) points; 2) goal difference; 3) number of goals scored.
(C) Champions; (P) Promoted; (R) Relegated

=== Stadia and locations ===
Locations of the 2013–14 Wessex League Premier Division teams

Team	Stadium
A.F.C. Portchester	Wicor Recreation Ground
Alresford Town	Arlesbury Park
Bemerton Heath Harlequins	Moon Park
Blackfield & Langley	Gang Warily
Bournemouth	Victoria Park
Brockenhurst	Grigg Lane
Christchurch	Hurn Bridge Sports Ground
Downton	Brian Whitehead Sports Ground
Fareham Town	Cams Alder
Fawley	Waterside Sports & Social Club
Folland Sports	Folland Park
Hamworthy United	The County Ground
Horndean	Five Heads Park
Lymington Town	The Sports Ground
Moneyfields	Moneyfields Sports Ground
Newport (IOW)	St Georges Park
Romsey Town	The Bypass Ground
Sholing	The Silverlake Arena
Totton & Eling	Little Testwood Farm
Verwood Town	Potterne Park
Whitchurch United	Longmeadow
Winchester City	The City Ground

== Division One ==
Division One featured 17 teams, increased from the 16 teams which competed in the previous season, after Brockenhurst and Whitchurch United were promoted to the Premier Division.

Three clubs joined the division:

- Andover Town, a newly formed club.
- Hayling United, demoted from the Premier Division after failing ground grading.
- New Milton Town, relegated from the Premier Division.

=== League table ===
Pos	Team	Pld	W	D	L	GF	GA	GD	Pts	Promotion
1	Petersfield Town (C, P)	30	23	5	2	118	36	+82	74	Promotion to Wessex Premier Division
2	Andover Town (P)	30	23	4	3	108	28	+80	73	Promotion to Wessex Premier Division
3	Cowes Sports	30	22	3	5	84	36	+48	69	
4	Hythe & Dibden	30	19	5	6	85	37	+48	62	
5	Tadley Calleva	30	15	7	8	64	43	+21	52	
6	Team Solent	30	16	5	9	82	51	+31	50 (Note: Team Solent had three points deducted.)	
7	United Services Portsmouth	30	14	5	11	61	53	+8	47	
8	Pewsey Vale	30	14	4	12	59	52	+7	46	
9	Laverstock & Ford	30	12	2	16	46	54	−8	38	
10	Amesbury Town	30	12	2	16	56	66	−10	38	
11	New Milton Town	30	10	2	18	69	71	−2	32	
12	Fleet Spurs	30	8	3	19	50	79	−29	27	
13	Ringwood Town	30	7	1	22	41	104	−63	22	
14	Hayling United	30	6	4	20	47	106	−59	21 (Note: Hayling United had one point deducted.)	Resigned before the 2014–15 season
15	Andover New Street	30	7	0	23	33	111	−78	21	
16	East Cowes Victoria Athletic	30	4	4	22	32	108	−76	16	
17	Stockbridge	0	0	0	0	0	0	0	0 (Note: Stockbridge resigned from the Wessex League on 18 February 2014 due to problems fulfilling their fixtures. Their record (P13 W5 D1 L7 GF25 GA34 Pts16) was subsequently expunged.)	Resigned, record expunged

Updated to match(es) played on 3 May 2014. Source: FA Full-Time, League Official
Rules for classification: 1) points; 2) goal difference; 3) number of goals scored.
(C) Champions; (P) Promoted

=== Stadia and locations ===
Locations of the 2013–14 Wessex League Division One teams

Team	Stadium
Amesbury Town	Bonnymead Park
Andover Town	Portway Stadium
Andover New Street	Foxcote Park
Cowes Sports	Westwood Park
East Cowes Victoria Athletic	Beatrice Avenue
Fleet Spurs	Kennels Lane
Hayling United	Hayling College
Hythe & Dibden	Ewart Recreation Ground
Laverstock & Ford	The Dell
New Milton Town	Fawcett's Field
Petersfield Town	The Love Lane Stadium
Pewsey Vale	The Recreation Ground
Ringwood Town	Long Lane
Stockbridge	Recreation Ground
Tadley Calleva	Barlow's Park
Team Solent	Test Park Sports Ground
United Services Portsmouth	The Victory Stadium
