= 2012–13 Wessex Football League =

Wessex Football League
- Season: 2012–13

The 2012–13 Wessex Football League (known as the Sydenhams Football League (Wessex) for sponsorship reasons) was the 27th season of the Wessex Football League since its establishment in 1986.

The league consisted of two divisions: the Premier Division and Division One. Both divisions this season consisted of fewer teams than last season – the Premier Division had 21 teams and Division One had 16 teams.

== Premier Division ==
Wessex Football League Premier Division
- Champions: Blackfield & Langley
- Relegated: New Milton Town; Hayling United
- Top goalscorer: 36 Aleksander Przespolewski (Newport (IOW))
- Highest attendance: 448 Alton Town v Hayling United
- Lowest attendance: 11 Hayling United v Hamworthy United; Hayling United v Newport (IOW)

The Premier Division featured 21 teams, reduced from 22 the previous season, after Winchester City were promoted to the Southern League, Laverstock & Ford were relegated to Division One, and Brading Town withdrew from the league.

Two new teams joined the Premier Division, both promoted from Division One:

- A.F.C. Portchester
- Verwood Town
- Only Newport (IOW) applied for promotion from this league, and would have been promoted if they had finished in any of the top three places and their application was accepted. However, they failed to achieve a high enough finish, so there was no promotion this season.
- New Milton Town were to resign from the Wessex League at the end of the season in preparation for their merger with Bashley of the Southern League. On 13 May it was reported that New Milton had pulled out of the merger, and were preparing for at least another season in the Wessex League.

=== League table ===
Pos	Team	Pld	W	D	L	GF	GA	GD	Pts	Relegation
1	Blackfield & Langley (C)	40	31	6	3	100	31	+69	99	
2	Alresford Town	40	29	2	9	124	51	+73	89	
3	Christchurch	40	26	6	8	106	49	+57	84	
4	Moneyfields	40	22	8	10	85	50	+35	74	
5	Bemerton Heath Harlequins	40	22	8	10	91	57	+34	74	
6	Newport (IOW)	40	19	11	10	76	63	+13	68	
7	GE Hamble	40	19	9	12	87	73	+14	66	
8	Downton	40	19	8	13	81	61	+20	65	
9	Fareham Town	40	19	5	16	77	72	+5	62	
10	Hamworthy United	40	15	9	16	76	73	+3	54	
11	Horndean	40	15	7	18	79	93	−14	52	
12	Totton & Eling	40	14	8	18	66	81	−15	50	
13	Bournemouth	40	14	7	19	72	95	−23	49	
14	Verwood Town	40	11	13	16	63	68	−5	46	
15	AFC Portchester	40	13	7	20	69	85	−16	46	
16	Hayling United	40	13	5	22	74	112	−38	44	Demoted for ground grading reasons
17	Fawley	40	12	5	23	62	91	−29	41	
18	Alton Town	40	12	4	24	67	92	−25	40	Transferred to Combined Counties League
19	Lymington Town	40	9	11	20	47	69	−22	38	
20	Romsey Town	40	7	1	32	38	137	−99	22 (Note: Romsey Town reprieved from relegation after Hayling were demoted.)	
21	New Milton Town (R)	40	6	6	28	51	88	−37	21 (Note: New Milton Town were unable to raise a team for the match at Newport IOW, and had three points deducted. Newport were awarded the win.)	Relegation to Wessex League Division One

Updated to match(es) played on 13 May 2013. Source: FA Full-Time, League Official
Rules for classification: 1) points; 2) goal difference; 3) number of goals scored.
(C) Champions; (R) Relegated

=== Results grid ===
Home \ Away	POR	ALR	ALT	BHH	BFL	BRN	CHR	DOW	FAR	FAW	GEH	HAM	HAY	HOR	LYM	MON	NMT	NEW	ROM	TAE	VER
AFC Portchester		3–2	2–1	0–0	1–4	4–1	3–4	0–1	2–5	4–1	1–0	3–3	2–5	3–2	1–1	1–2	3–0	1–3	1–1	0–2	0–0
Alresford Town	3–0		4–1	5–1	2–4	4–2	2–0	4–2	6–0	5–0	6–0	2–0	2–1	5–3	3–0	3–2	3–1	5–1	3–0	2–4	1–1
Alton Town	1–2	0–5		0–3	2–3	1–4	3–3	1–5	3–0	2–0	2–4	2–5	4–0	0–1	3–2	1–2	5–1	1–3	5–1	4–0	4–4
Bemerton Heath Harlequins	5–1	2–3	0–0		1–5	5–4	1–0	3–3	3–0	4–3	0–2	4–2	4–0	1–2	2–0	2–2	4–1	2–2	3–0	2–3	4–1
Blackfield & Langley	3–2	2–0	4–0	1–0		2–2	1–0	2–0	1–1	3–0	1–1	5–1	0–1	7–1	2–0	1–0	1–1	4–1	6–1	1–0 (Note: (5 Mar 8–0): Result expunged as BFL fielded an ineligible player.(2 Apr): Replay is 18 Apr.)	1–0
Bournemouth	6–2	0–5	3–4	3–3	2–4		1–1	1–2	3–1	1–0	1–0	2–1	4–6	1–1	0–3	0–3	2–2	1–4	4–1	2–1	1–0
Christchurch	1–2	3–0	2–1	1–2	3–0	3–0		4–2	1–2	2–2	3–0	4–0	3–1	4–0	4–1	3–0	3–1	6–3	4–0	5–0	7–4
Downton	2–0	2–1	3–1	0–0	4–0	2–3	1–1		0–2	0–0	7–3	1–0	1–3	3–1	1–2	0–0	2–2	1–1	1–3	4–3	1–3
Fareham Town	3–1	1–0	4–1	1–2	1–2	7–1	1–1	3–2		2–1	1–5	2–3	4–2	2–1	0–2	1–3	2–0	2–3	5–2	1–2	1–1
Fawley	2–1	1–2	2–1	0–3	0–3	4–1	1–1	0–5	2–4		2–2	3–1	2–0	1–2	2–1	1–5	2–1	3–4	4–2	0–1	2–2
GE Hamble	1–4	2–3	0–3	3–1	1–4	3–1	1–3	2–1	1–0	2–0		1–1	2–3	4–2	2–1	0–4	2–1	1–1	7–1	4–0	2–2
Hamworthy United	2–2	1–0	5–1	0–1	0–0	1–3	2–3	2–1	2–2	7–4	1–1		8–0	0–4	1–1	0–2	2–1	2–2	3–0	3–1	2–2
Hayling United	1–3	0–4	3–0	3–2	1–4	1–3	2–0	1–3	1–5	3–2	3–3	1–2		2–4	2–2	0–2	2–1	1–3	3–2	2–2	3–3
Horndean	2–0	2–4	2–0	1–3	0–1	1–1	1–3	2–3	0–2	2–1	3–3 (Note: (2 Feb 1–3): Result expunged. There is no official statement about the reason (17 Mar): Replay is 28 Mar.)	3–2	4–4		2–2	1–5	1–3	3–2	1–2	5–3	2–1
Lymington Town	3–3	0–4	1–3	0–5	1–1	3–1	0–3	1–3	1–2	1–0	1–3	0–1	1–0	1–1		1–2	0–2	1–1	3–1	1–2	0–0
Moneyfields	5–2	2–4	2–0	2–2	0–1	4–1	0–3	3–4	4–0	2–0	1–2	3–0	3–1	3–3	1–1		2–2	2–2	6–2	0–3	2–0
New Milton Town	1–3	2–4	0–1	0–1	0–5	2–0	2–3	0–3	1–4	1–2	1–3	1–3	3–4	4–1	1–1	0–1		1–1	5–0	1–2	0–2
Newport (IOW)	1–0	3–2	0–3	0–2	0–1	1–0	2–3	1–0	3–0	1–2	1–1	1–0	4–3	0–4	1–0	2–0			7–0	1–1	2–2
Romsey Town	0–3	0–7	2–1	0–4	0–5	0–1	0–4	0–2	2–0	4–3	0–7	1–4	4–2	1–3	0–3	0–1	1–3	1–3		1–4	1–0
Totton & Eling	2–1	2–2	1–1	0–3	0–2	1–1	2–3	1–2	0–2	2–5	2–5	3–2	2–3	5–3	0–2	0–0	4–1	0–0	4–1		1–3
Verwood Town	3–2	0–2	4–0	3–1	0–3	2–4	2–1	1–1	1–1	1–2	0–1	0–1	5–0	1–2	3–2	0–2	3–1	1–5	2–0	0–0	

Updated to match(es) played on 4 May 2013. Source: FA Full-Time, mitoo(BRN v FAR)
Legend: Blue = home team win; Yellow = draw; Red = away team win.

=== Stadia and locations ===
Locations of the 2012–13 Wessex League Premier Division teams

Team	Stadium
A.F.C. Portchester	Wicor Recreation Ground
Alresford Town	Arlesbury Park
Alton Town	Bass Sports Ground
Bemerton Heath Harlequins	Moon Park
Blackfield & Langley	Gang Warily
Bournemouth	Victoria Park
Christchurch	Hurn Bridge Sports Ground
Downton	Brian Whitehead Sports Ground
Fareham Town	Cams Alder
Fawley	Waterside Sports & Social Club
GE Hamble	Folland Park
Hamworthy United	The County Ground
Hayling United	College Ground
Horndean	Five Heads Park
Lymington Town	The Sports Ground
Moneyfields	Moneyfields Sports Ground
New Milton Town	Fawcett's Field
Newport (IOW)	St Georges Park
Romsey Town	The Bypass Ground
Totton & Eling	Little Testwood Farm
Verwood Town	Potterne Park

== Division One ==
Wessex Football League Division One
- Champions: Brockenhurst
- Promoted: Brockenhurst; Whitchurch United
- Top goalscorer: 24 Gareth Bricknell (Cowes Sports); Callum Coker (Petersfield Town); Declan Edwards (Brockenhurst & Team Solent); Sam Knowles (Fleet Spurs)
- Highest attendance: 142 Brockenhurst v Whitchurch United
- Lowest attendance: 2 Fleet Spurs v Stockbridge

Division One featured 16 teams, reduced from 18 the previous season after AFC Portchester and Verwood Town were promoted to the Premier Division, and Warminster Town transferred to the Western League.

One new team joined, relegated from the Premier Division:

- Laverstock & Ford

=== League table ===
Pos	Team	Pld	W	D	L	GF	GA	GD	Pts	Promotion
1	Brockenhurst (C, P)	30	22	3	5	82	26	+56	69	Promotion to Wessex League Premier Division
2	Whitchurch United (P)	30	22	3	5	76	23	+53	69	Promotion to Wessex League Premier Division
3	Team Solent	30	20	4	6	65	37	+28	64	
4	Cowes Sports	30	20	2	8	77	36	+41	62	
5	Pewsey Vale	30	15	8	7	72	41	+31	53	
6	Petersfield Town	30	16	5	9	76	46	+30	53	
7	Tadley Calleva	30	15	3	12	69	45	+24	48	
8	East Cowes Victoria Athletic	30	14	7	9	70	55	+15	48 (Note: The match between Pewsey Vale and East Cowes Victoria was not played. It was registered as a 0–0 draw, although East Cowes subsequently had one point deducted.)	
9	Ringwood Town	30	10	4	16	48	71	−23	34	
10	Fleet Spurs	30	10	3	17	49	55	−6	33	
11	Stockbridge	30	10	2	18	48	80	−32	32	
12	United Services Portsmouth	30	9	4	17	56	76	−20	31	
13	Laverstock & Ford	30	8	7	15	41	71	−30	31	
14	Amesbury Town	30	7	4	19	31	76	−45	25	
15	Andover New Street	30	4	8	18	40	93	−53	20	
16	Hythe & Dibden	30	3	3	24	27	96	−69	12	

Updated to match(es) played on 1 May 2013. Source: FA Full-Time, League Official
Rules for classification: 1) points; 2) goal difference; 3) number of goals scored.
(C) Champions; (P) Promoted

=== Results grid ===
Home \ Away	AME	ANS	BRO	COW	ECV	FLE	HYT	LAV	PET	PEW	RIN	STO	TAD	TSO	USP	WHI
Amesbury Town		2–1	0–3	0–2	2–2	1–0	3–1	1–1	2–1	1–3	2–3	1–0	2–1	1–2	2–1	1–4
Andover New Street	2–2		0–2	1–1	3–5	1–0	2–1	1–4	0–5	0–3	2–0	2–2	1–2	1–1	3–5	1–4
Brockenhurst	5–0	0–1		2–0	5–0	0–0	3–0	1–0	1–3	1–0	5–1	6–1	2–1	1–0	3–0	0–2
Cowes Sports	3–0	7–0	1–3		2–4	1–0	3–0	4–0	2–2	4–2	8–2	2–1	2–1	1–0	2–0	0–4
East Cowes Victoria Athletic	1–0	6–2	0–2	1–0		3–1	2–1	7–2	2–1	1–1	6–0	9–0	1–2	1–1	3–0	1–3
Fleet Spurs	4–0	4–2	0–3	1–0	5–1		1–1	1–3	4–3	2–6	2–3	2–3	2–3	0–1	5–2	0–0
Hythe & Dibden	2–1	1–1	0–6	2–6	1–3	1–0		2–3	2–4	3–6	0–5	0–3	1–4	1–2	0–1	1–2
Laverstock & Ford	1–0	4–3	0–3	0–8	1–1	2–4	2–3		1–1	2–2	0–1	1–0	2–1	1–3	1–3	0–1
Petersfield Town	3–0	5–1	5–4	1–2	5–0	3–0	4–0	2–1		3–3	0–0	4–0	0–1	1–2	2–0	0–4
Pewsey Vale	6–2	8–0	3–0	0–1		0–1	5–1	3–3	0–0		1–1	2–1	2–1	3–2	1–1	1–2
Ringwood Town	0–0	3–2	2–2	3–1	0–4	2–3	4–0	0–1	2–5	2–4		1–2	3–2	0–1	1–6	1–0
Stockbridge	2–1	4–1	4–5	3–4	2–2	0–3	6–1	2–0	3–4	1–0	2–1		0–4	2–3	2–0	0–3
Tadley Calleva	5–2	6–0	0–0	0–2	5–2	3–1	5–0	2–2	2–4	0–1	2–1	5–0		4–3	1–3	0–1
Team Solent	2–1	2–2	1–4	0–4	2–0	2–1	1–1	2–0	4–3	4–1	2–1	3–1	3–0		6–1	4–0
United Services Portsmouth	6–1	3–3	0–8	2–4	2–2	3–1	5–0	3–3	1–2	1–3	3–5	2–1	1–5	0–1		1–3
Whitchurch United	9–0	1–1	1–2	1–0	4–0	2–1	3–0	6–0	2–0	0–2	3–0	8–0	1–1	0–5	2–0	

Updated to match(es) played on 1 May 2013. Source: FA Full-Time, mitoo
Legend: Blue = home team win; Yellow = draw; Red = away team win.

=== Stadia and locations ===
Locations of the 2012–13 Wessex League Division One teams

Team	Stadium
Amesbury Town	Bonnymead Park
Andover New Street	Foxcote Park
Brockenhurst	Grigg Lane
Cowes Sports	Westwood Park
East Cowes Victoria Athletic	Beatrice Avenue
Fleet Spurs	Kennels Lane
Hythe & Dibden	Ewart Recreation Ground
Laverstock & Ford	The Dell
Petersfield Town	The Love Lane Stadium
Pewsey Vale	The Recreation Ground
Ringwood Town	Long Lane
Stockbridge	Recreation Ground
Tadley Calleva	Barlow's Park
Team Solent	Test Park Sports Ground
United Services Portsmouth	The Victory Stadium
Whitchurch United	Longmeadow
