= 2015–16 Wessex Football League =

Wessex Football League
- Season: 2015–16
- Champions: Salisbury

The 2015–16 Wessex Football League season (known as the Sydenhams Football League (Wessex) for sponsorship reasons) was the 30th in the history of the Wessex Football League since its establishment in 1986.

The league consisted of two divisions: the Premier Division and Division One. The constitution was announced on 23 June 2015.

== Premier Division ==
The Premier Division featured 21 teams, the same as last season, after Petersfield Town and Winchester City were promoted to the Southern League, and Christchurch and Totton & Eling were relegated to Division One.

Four teams joined the division:

- Cowes Sports, runners-up in Division One.
- Salisbury, a new club formed after the liquidation of Salisbury City.
- Sholing, demoted from Southern League Division One South & West for ground grading reasons.
- Team Solent, champions of Division One.

Four clubs applied for promotion to Step 4: AFC Portchester, Andover Town, Blackfield & Langley and Salisbury. AFC Portchester and Blackfield & Langley failed the ground grading requirements.

=== League table ===
Pos	Team	Pld	W	D	L	GF	GA	GD	Pts	Promotion or relegation
1	Salisbury (C, P)	40	34	3	3	126	29	+97	105	Promotion to the Southern League Division One South & West
2	Sholing	40	26	7	7	80	38	+42	85	
3	Blackfield & Langley	40	26	5	9	92	45	+47	83	
4	Andover Town	40	25	7	8	97	58	+39	82	
5	Horndean	40	22	7	11	87	56	+31	73	
6	AFC Portchester	40	20	11	9	86	41	+45	71	
7	Team Solent	40	21	4	15	78	71	+7	67	
8	Moneyfields	40	19	8	13	71	61	+10	65	
9	Bemerton Heath Harlequins	40	18	9	13	87	64	+23	63	
10	Newport (IOW)	40	18	3	19	65	66	−1	57	
11	Cowes Sports	40	15	10	15	67	76	−9	55	
12	Fareham Town	40	14	9	17	64	71	−7	51	
13	Lymington Town	40	14	9	17	51	65	−14	51	
14	Brockenhurst	40	11	11	18	71	87	−16	44	
15	Whitchurch United	40	12	8	20	66	82	−16	44	
16	Hamworthy United	40	12	5	23	58	86	−28	41	
17	Verwood Town	40	10	10	20	47	74	−27	40	
18	Bournemouth	40	10	7	23	56	100	−44	37	
19	Fawley	40	6	13	21	53	85	−32	31	
20	Alresford Town	40	5	5	30	44	127	−83	20 (Note: Alresford Town were reprieved from relegation.)	
21	Folland Sports (R)	40	5	3	32	48	112	−64	18	Relegation to Division One

Updated to match(es) played on 9 May 2016. Source: thefa.com
Rules for classification: 1) points; 2) goal difference; 3) number of goals scored.
(C) Champions; (P) Promoted; (R) Relegated

== Division One ==
Division One featured 18 teams, increased from the 15 teams which competed last season, after Cowes Sports and Team Solent were promoted to the Premier Division.

Five clubs joined the division:

- A.F.C. Stoneham, promoted from the Hampshire Premier League, rejoining after leaving in 2007.
- Alton Town, transferring from the Combined Counties League.
- Christchurch, relegated from the Premier Division.
- Portland United, promoted from the Dorset Premier League, rejoining after leaving in 2006.
- Totton & Eling, relegated from the Premier Division.

=== League table ===
Pos	Team	Pld	W	D	L	GF	GA	GD	Pts	Promotion
1	Portland United (C, P)	34	27	3	4	97	25	+72	84	Promotion to the Premier Division
2	Amesbury Town (P)	34	24	5	5	89	36	+53	77	Promotion to the Premier Division
3	Tadley Calleva	34	22	6	6	98	41	+57	72	
4	United Services Portsmouth	34	20	4	10	71	49	+22	61 (Note: US Portsmouth were deducted three points for fielding an ineligible player.)	
5	Laverstock & Ford	34	17	7	10	68	51	+17	58	
6	Christchurch	34	16	8	10	75	49	+26	56	
7	Alton Town	34	16	4	14	70	64	+6	52	
8	AFC Stoneham	34	14	9	11	75	56	+19	51	
9	Romsey Town	34	16	2	16	50	54	−4	50	
10	Downton	34	13	7	14	52	54	−2	46	
11	Hythe & Dibden	34	13	6	15	55	68	−13	45	
12	Fleet Spurs	34	12	8	14	70	82	−12	44	
13	Ringwood Town	34	12	5	17	73	64	+9	41	
14	New Milton Town	34	10	8	16	46	65	−19	38	
15	Totton & Eling	34	9	4	21	67	72	−5	31	
16	Andover New Street	34	8	4	22	30	111	−81	28	
17	Pewsey Vale	34	6	2	26	33	97	−64	20 (Note: US Portsmouth v Pewsey Vale on 14 April 2016 was a home walkover.)	
18	East Cowes Victoria Athletic	34	4	2	28	36	117	−81	14	

Updated to match(es) played on 7 May 2016. Source: FA Full-Time, League Official
Rules for classification: 1) points; 2) goal difference; 3) number of goals scored.
(C) Champions; (P) Promoted
