= 2014–15 Wessex Football League =

Wessex Football League
- Season: 2014–15
- Champions: Petersfield Town

The 2014–15 Wessex Football League season (known as the Sydenhams Football League (Wessex) for sponsorship reasons) was the 29th in the history of the Wessex Football League since its establishment in 1986.

The league consists of two divisions: the Premier Division and Division One.

== Premier Division ==
Wessex Football League Premier Division
- Champions: Petersfield Town
- Promoted: Petersfield Town, Winchester City
- Matches: 420
- Goals: 1,522 (3.62 per match)
- Top goalscorer: 56 – Warren Bentley (Winchester City)
- Biggest home win: AFC Portchester 8–0 Folland Sports, (24 February 2015)
- Biggest away win: Petersfield Town 0–8 Bournemouth, (31 January 2015)
- Highest scoring: Newport (IOW) 8–2 Fawley, (19 August 2014)

The Premier Division featured 21 teams, one fewer than last season, after Sholing were promoted to the Southern League, and Downton and Romsey Town were relegated to Division One.

Two teams joined the division:

- Andover Town, runners-up in Division One.
- Petersfield Town, champions of Division One.

Salisbury City, who were removed from the Football Conference due to their financial problems, applied to the Wessex League for entry for the 2014–15 season. This was despite the fact that the league had already started, with some clubs having played seven matches. The club was still threatened with liquidation in the High Court. However, the application was rejected by the league due to problems within the club's structure on and off the pitch, and the ongoing court cases.

The following clubs applied for promotion to Step 4: AFC Portchester, Blackfield & Langley, Moneyfields, Petersfield Town and Winchester City.

Petersfield Town were promoted as champions, and after another place opened up in the Southern League in June 2015, Winchester City were also promoted.

=== League table ===
Pos	Team	Pld	W	D	L	GF	GA	GD	Pts	Promotion or relegation
1	Petersfield Town (C, P)	40	29	9	2	118	42	+76	96	Promotion to the Southern League
2	Winchester City (P)	40	28	5	7	120	38	+82	89	Promotion to the Southern League
3	AFC Portchester	40	25	7	8	91	45	+46	82	
4	Moneyfields	40	22	9	9	92	42	+50	75	
5	Blackfield & Langley	40	21	10	9	83	44	+39	73	
6	Whitchurch United	40	20	7	13	80	76	+4	67	
7	Newport (IOW)	40	20	5	15	69	52	+17	65	
8	Folland Sports	40	20	5	15	74	74	0	65	
9	Lymington Town	40	19	5	16	70	57	+13	62	
10	Hamworthy United	40	15	10	15	71	65	+6	55	
11	Horndean	40	16	7	17	62	69	−7	55	
12	Andover Town	40	16	4	20	66	70	−4	52	
13	Bemerton Heath Harlequins	40	15	7	18	65	81	−16	52	
14	Brockenhurst	40	15	5	20	72	89	−17	50	
15	Verwood Town	40	13	5	22	57	79	−22	44	
16	Alresford Town	40	11	6	23	64	82	−18	39	
17	Fawley	40	10	8	22	44	81	−37	38	
18	Bournemouth	40	9	8	23	61	126	−65	35	
19	Fareham Town	40	7	11	22	50	92	−42	32	
20	Totton & Eling (R)	40	8	7	25	53	107	−54	31	Relegation to Division One
21	Christchurch (R)	40	7	8	25	60	111	−51	29	Relegation to Division One

Updated to match(es) played on 23:22, 29 April 2015 (UTC). Source: http://full-time.thefa.com/Index.do?league=274386
Rules for classification: 1) points; 2) goal difference; 3) number of goals scored.
(C) Champions; (P) Promoted; (R) Relegated

=== Stadia and locations ===
Locations of the 2014–15 Wessex League Premier Division teams

Team	Stadium
A.F.C. Portchester	Wicor Recreation Ground
Alresford Town	Arlesbury Park
Andover Town	Portway Stadium
Bemerton Heath Harlequins	Moon Park
Blackfield & Langley	Gang Warily
Bournemouth	Victoria Park
Brockenhurst	Grigg Lane
Christchurch	Hurn Bridge Sports Ground
Fareham Town	Cams Alder
Fawley	Waterside Sports & Social Club
Folland Sports	Folland Park
Hamworthy United	The County Ground
Horndean	Five Heads Park
Lymington Town	The Sports Ground
Moneyfields	Moneyfields Sports Ground
Newport (IOW)	St Georges Park
Petersfield Town	The Love Lane Stadium
Totton & Eling	Little Testwood Farm
Verwood Town	Potterne Park
Whitchurch United	Longmeadow
Winchester City	The City Ground

=== Results ===
Home \ Away	POR	ALR	AND	BHH	BFL	BOU	BRO	CHR	FAR	FAW	FOL	HAM	HOR	LYM	MON	NEW	PET	TAE	VER	WHI	WCC
AFC Portchester		2–1	3–3	0–3	3–1	1–1	2–1	2–2	5–0	3–1	8–0	2–0	2–1	2–1	0–5	2–0	1–1	5–1	3–0	1–0	0–2
Alresford Town	2–5		2–2	3–3	1–1	4–1	0–2	3–0	3–1	0–1	1–3	0–2	2–0	2–0	0–2	1–5	0–2	3–1	0–1	2–3	2–4
Andover Town	0–3	3–2		3–1	2–3	1–3	2–0	4–0	0–1	0–0	0–1	2–0	2–1	0–1	0–3	0–1	1–2	5–2	3–2	4–3	1–2
Bemerton Heath Harlequins	1–1	1–1	4–1		1–1	6–1	3–1	4–3	3–0	2–3	1–2	0–5	2–0	2–1	1–6	0–1	1–1	2–1	3–4	2–2	1–0
Blackfield & Langley	2–0	1–0	2–1	4–0		2–1	4–1	6–0	0–0	1–1	3–0	4–2	1–2	2–1	2–1	0–1	0–0	0–0	5–0	4–1	0–1
Bournemouth	2–6	2–5	1–2	3–2	0–3		2–2	1–1	4–1	2–2	0–2	0–2	3–0	2–0	0–5	1–5	0–8	3–1	0–2	2–5	0–6
Brockenhurst	0–1	2–1	1–1	5–0	0–6	3–4		5–1	2–1	2–3	4–2	4–3	4–2	4–1	0–4	1–0	1–4	6–3	1–5	0–1	3–0
Christchurch	0–1	0–3	5–1	2–0	1–2	7–0	4–2		3–0	1–1	2–3	2–2	1–2	4–2	0–4	1–1	1–6	2–2	1–4	1–2	1–2
Fareham Town	1–2	2–2	0–2	2–0	1–0	1–1	2–2	7–1		1–1	1–1	6–1	1–2	0–2	1–2	2–1	0–7	5–1	2–2	1–2	1–6
Fawley	2–1	2–4	1–0	0–1	0–1	1–3	0–2	4–1	2–0		1–2	0–3	1–0	0–4	2–1	0–1	0–0	0–1	0–1	2–5	0–3
Folland Sports	1–0	3–1	2–3	2–3	2–3	1–1	2–1	3–1	3–0	2–1		4–3	4–4	0–2	0–1	2–1	2–4	5–2	3–5	0–0	1–1
Hamworthy United	0–3	0–0	2–0	1–3	1–1	3–1	0–2	1–1	1–1	4–2	0–2		2–1	4–2	1–0	3–2	2–2	3–3	4–0	2–0	1–1
Horndean	2–7	1–0	3–2	3–1	1–2	2–2	3–0	3–0	5–1	0–0	2–0	1–0		0–4	1–1	2–2	0–1	1–2	0–0	3–3	0–1
Lymington Town	3–1	4–1	2–1	2–0	3–1	1–5	1–0	3–1	1–1	2–1	1–2	1–1	0–1		5–1	1–1	1–2	1–0	2–1	1–1	0–3
Moneyfields	1–2	3–0	2–1	2–0	1–1	5–0	5–1	2–2	6–1	2–2	1–0	3–2	1–2	1–1		0–0	1–1	5–2	2–0	5–2	1–2
Newport (IOW)	1–1	3–0	1–2	2–3	3–2	4–1	1–0	3–1	2–0	8–2	3–0	2–1	0–2	3–0	0–2		0–1	1–0	1–0	1–0	0–1
Petersfield Town	1–0	5–2	4–1	1–0	3–2	5–3	5–0	4–0	4–2	5–1	1–6	2–2	4–1	1–0	0–0	4–2		4–1	5–1	4–0	2–2
Totton & Eling	0–4	1–4	0–5	2–2	1–4	3–0	1–1	0–2	1–1	3–2	1–2	0–3	5–0	1–6	2–0	2–4	0–4		2–1	1–3	1–0
Verwood Town	1–4	1–4	0–1	0–2	2–1	3–3	2–2	4–0	1–0	0–1	1–2	0–1	0–3	0–4	1–1	5–0	0–3	4–1		2–1	1–5
Whitchurch United	1–2	2–1	2–1	3–1	3–3	6–2	0–3	5–3	2–2	3–1	1–0	3–2	3–2	0–3	0–4	3–1	3–2	1–1	1–0		3–1
Winchester City	0–0	5–1	2–3	6–0	2–2	7–0	7–1	7–1	6–0	5–0	5–2	2–1	2–3	4–0	4–0	3–1	2–3	3–0	2–0	3–1	

Updated to match(es) played on 29 April 2015. Source:
Legend: Blue = home team win; Yellow = draw; Red = away team win.

== Division One ==
Division One featured 15 teams, reduced from the 17 teams which competed last season, after Hayling United and Stockbridge resigned, and Andover Town and Petersfield Town were promoted to the Premier Division.

Two clubs joined the division:

- Downton, relegated from the Premier Division.
- Romsey Town, relegated from the Premier Division.

=== League table ===
Pos	Team	Pld	W	D	L	GF	GA	GD	Pts	Promotion
1	Team Solent (C, P)	28	22	1	5	83	38	+45	67	Promotion to the Premier Division
2	Cowes Sports (P)	28	20	4	4	78	32	+46	64	Promotion to the Premier Division
3	Tadley Calleva	28	20	3	5	86	33	+53	63	
4	Amesbury Town	28	18	0	10	85	41	+44	54	
5	United Services Portsmouth	28	16	3	9	68	46	+22	51	
6	New Milton Town	28	15	4	9	70	49	+21	49	
7	Hythe & Dibden	28	14	2	12	42	48	−6	44	
8	Laverstock & Ford	28	12	3	13	39	54	−15	39	
9	Fleet Spurs	28	11	5	12	50	63	−13	38	
10	Pewsey Vale	28	9	4	15	44	48	−4	31	
11	Ringwood Town	28	9	4	15	42	53	−11	31	
12	Downton	28	6	9	13	33	48	−15	27	
13	Andover New Street	28	7	4	17	37	66	−29	25	
14	Romsey Town	28	4	4	20	40	81	−41	16	
15	East Cowes Victoria Athletic	28	1	2	25	18	115	−97	5	

Updated to match(es) played on 16:52, 25 April 2015 (UTC). Source: FA Full-Time, League Official
Rules for classification: 1) points; 2) goal difference; 3) number of goals scored.
(C) Champions; (P) Promoted

=== Stadia and locations ===
Locations of the 2014–15 Wessex League Division One teams

Team	Stadium
Amesbury Town	Bonnymead Park
Andover New Street	Foxcote Park
Cowes Sports	Westwood Park
Downton	Brian Whitehead Sports Ground
East Cowes Victoria Athletic	Beatrice Avenue
Fleet Spurs	Kennels Lane
Hythe & Dibden	Ewart Recreation Ground
Laverstock & Ford	The Dell
New Milton Town	Fawcett's Field
Pewsey Vale	The Recreation Ground
Ringwood Town	Long Lane
Romsey Town	The Bypass Ground
Tadley Calleva	Barlow's Park
Team Solent	Test Park Sports Ground
United Services Portsmouth	The Victory Stadium

=== Results ===
Home \ Away	AME	ANS	COW	DOW	ECV	FLE	HYT	LAV	NMT	PEW	RIN	ROM	TAD	TSO	USP
Amesbury Town		5–1	1–2	3–2	4–0	4–1	1–2	4–1	4–2	4–0	5–0	3–1	1–2	3–2	0–3
Andover New Street	2–1		3–1	1–1	1–1	1–2	2–1	2–0	1–1	0–1	0–3	4–2	2–5	1–2	1–4
Cowes Sports	2–1	3–1		4–0	4–1	4–0	0–2	6–0	5–3	2–0	4–1	3–1	3–2	1–3	3–2
Downton	0–6	3–1	0–0		0–1	1–0	1–0	0–1	1–1	2–3	0–2	3–2	1–1	2–3	1–1
East Cowes Victoria Athletic	1–7	3–4	0–4	0–5		0–5	0–5	0–4	0–4	0–9	1–6	1–3	1–9	0–4	0–5
Fleet Spurs	4–2	4–2	1–1	1–1	1–0		2–1	3–0	2–2	2–1	2–1	3–4	0–3	1–4	1–7
Hythe & Dibden	1–0	1–0	0–4	1–1	2–0	3–2		1–5	2–1	0–2	0–0	3–2	2–0	1–3	1–4
Laverstock & Ford	0–2	2–1	0–6	2–2	2–1	0–0	3–1		0–3	2–2	1–0	2–1	1–2	2–1	3–4
New Milton Town	3–0	4–0	1–3	3–1	3–0	4–2	2–3	3–0		3–2	3–2	4–2	1–3	2–3	3–0
Pewsey Vale	1–5	2–0	2–0	3–0	3–0	1–2	0–1	0–1	1–2		0–1	1–1	2–5	2–2	4–0
Ringwood Town	0–3	2–2	1–2	1–1	5–1	0–0	2–3	2–0	2–4	2–1		3–0	1–4	0–1	0–1
Romsey Town	0–4	2–3	2–2	2–1	3–3	0–3	1–3	0–5	2–4	2–0	1–3		2–2	1–2	0–4
Tadley Calleva	4–1	4–0	0–3	0–2	6–0	4–1	4–1	4–0	1–1	2–0	6–0	4–2		0–4	6–0
Team Solent	2–8	2–0	1–3	3–0	3–1	8–3	3–1	3–1	3–2	6–0	6–2	4–0	0–1		2–0
United Services Portsmouth	2–3	4–1	3–3	2–1	4–2	4–2	3–0	0–1	4–1	1–1	1–0	4–1	1–2	0–3	

Updated to match(es) played on 25 April 2015. Source:
Legend: Blue = home team win; Yellow = draw; Red = away team win.
