= 2016–17 Wessex Football League =

Wessex Football League
- Season: 2016–17
- Champions: Portland United
- Promoted: Moneyfields

The 2016–17 Wessex Football League season (known as the Sydenhams Football League (Wessex) for sponsorship reasons) was the 31st in the history of the Wessex Football League since its establishment in 1986.

The league consisted of two divisions: the Premier Division and Division One. The constitution was announced on 12 May 2016.

== Premier Division ==
The Premier Division was increased from 21 teams to 22 after Salisbury were promoted to the Southern League, and Folland Sports were relegated to Division One.

Three teams joined the division:

- Amesbury Town, runners-up in Division One.
- Bashley, relegated from Southern League Division One South & West.
- Portland United, champions of Division One.

AFC Portchester, Blackfield & Langley and Moneyfields have applied for promotion to Step 4 for 2017–18.

=== League table ===
Pos	Team	Pld	W	D	L	GF	GA	GD	Pts	Promotion or relegation
1	Portland United (C)	42	31	6	5	106	43	+63	99	
2	Moneyfields (P)	42	32	5	5	103	33	+70	98 (Note: Moneyfields were deducted three points for fielding a suspended player.)	Promotion to the Southern League Division One Central
3	Sholing	42	25	9	8	80	33	+47	84	
4	Blackfield & Langley	42	26	5	11	96	47	+49	83	
5	Alresford Town	42	24	5	13	87	63	+24	77	
6	Horndean	42	22	10	10	93	64	+29	76	
7	Team Solent	42	20	7	15	89	62	+27	67	
8	AFC Portchester	42	19	8	15	81	60	+21	65	
9	Lymington Town	42	18	7	17	69	59	+10	61	
10	Brockenhurst	42	16	11	15	70	70	0	59	
11	Bemerton Heath Harlequins	42	16	9	17	67	61	+6	57	
12	Fareham Town	42	16	8	18	78	81	−3	56	
13	Andover Town	42	16	6	20	69	61	+8	54	
14	Bashley	42	15	9	18	66	70	−4	54	
15	Newport (IOW)	42	12	17	13	57	62	−5	53	
16	Hamworthy United	42	13	6	23	71	89	−18	45	
17	Bournemouth	42	9	13	20	52	85	−33	40	
18	Cowes Sports	42	10	8	24	46	97	−51	38	
19	Amesbury Town	42	9	10	23	60	94	−34	37	
20	Fawley (R)	42	11	4	27	61	124	−63	37	Relegation to Division One
21	Whitchurch United (R)	42	8	8	26	50	116	−66	32	Relegation to Division One
22	Verwood Town (R)	42	5	7	30	40	117	−77	22	Relegation to Division One

Updated to match(es) played on 20:37, 26 April 2017 (UTC). Source: thefa.com
Rules for classification: 1) points; 2) goal difference; 3) number of goals scored.
(C) Champions; (P) Promoted; (R) Relegated

== Division One ==
Division One was increased from 18 teams to 21 after Amesbury Town and Portland United were promoted to the Premier Division.

Five clubs joined the division:

- Baffins Milton Rovers, promoted from the Hampshire Premier League.
- Folland Sports, relegated from the Premier Division.
- Hamble Club, promoted from the Hampshire Premier League, rejoining after leaving in 2007.
- Shaftesbury, promoted from the Dorset Premier League, rejoining after leaving in 2011.
- Weymouth Reserves, promoted from the Dorset Premier League.

Alton Town F.C. was renamed Alton F.C.

Reserve sides are not eligible for promotion to Step 5.

=== League table ===
Pos	Team	Pld	W	D	L	GF	GA	GD	Pts	Promotion
1	Hamble Club (C, P)	40	32	3	5	133	37	+96	99	Promotion to the Premier Division
2	Baffins Milton Rovers (P)	40	27	4	9	128	52	+76	85	Promotion to the Premier Division
3	Shaftesbury (P)	40	26	4	10	127	65	+62	82	Promotion to the Premier Division
4	Christchurch	40	22	10	8	88	57	+31	76	
5	Ringwood Town	40	23	6	11	90	56	+34	75	
6	Laverstock & Ford	40	24	0	16	102	71	+31	72	
7	Tadley Calleva	40	20	8	12	79	58	+21	68	
8	AFC Stoneham	40	21	4	15	94	65	+29	67	
9	United Services Portsmouth	40	19	10	11	97	71	+26	67	
10	Weymouth Reserves	40	19	7	14	99	63	+36	64	
11	Downton	40	19	6	15	66	53	+13	63	
12	Alton	40	19	5	16	82	87	−5	62	
13	Romsey Town	40	17	7	16	71	67	+4	58	
14	New Milton Town	40	15	6	19	66	94	−28	51	
15	Totton & Eling	40	12	11	17	64	68	−4	47	
16	Fleet Spurs	40	10	6	24	81	127	−46	36	Transferred to the Combined Counties League
17	Folland Sports	40	8	6	26	60	120	−60	30	
18	Hythe & Dibden	40	6	10	24	38	85	−47	28	
19	Andover New Street	40	7	5	28	39	112	−73	26	
20	East Cowes Victoria Athletic	40	5	8	27	36	120	−84	23 (Note: East Cowes Victoria Athletic and Pewsey Vale were reprieved from relegation, and Pewsey Vale were transferred)	
21	Pewsey Vale	40	3	6	31	45	157	−112	15	Transferred to the Hellenic League

Updated to match(es) played on 17:23, 22 April 2017 (UTC). Source: FA Full-Time, League Official
Rules for classification: 1) points; 2) goal difference; 3) number of goals scored.
(C) Champions; (P) Promoted
