= 2017–18 Wessex Football League =

Wessex Football League
- Season: 2017–18
- Champions: Blackfield & Langley
- Promoted: Blackfield & Langley
- Relegated: Amesbury Town, Newport (IOW), Petersfield Town

The 2017–18 Wessex Football League season (known as the Sydenhams Football League (Wessex) for sponsorship reasons) was the 32nd in the history of the Wessex Football League since its establishment in 1986.

The league consists of two divisions: the Premier Division and Division One. The constitution was announced on 26 May 2017.

== Premier Division ==
The Premier Division remained at 22 clubs after Moneyfields were promoted to the Southern League, and Fawley, Whitchurch United and Verwood Town were relegated to Division One.

Four teams joined the division:

- Baffins Milton Rovers, runners-up in Division One.
- Hamble Club, champions of Division One.
- Petersfield Town, relegated from Southern League Division One South & West.
- Shaftesbury, third-placed club in Division One.

With the suspension of ground grading Grade E for this season and the creation of a new league at Steps 3 and 4, the champions of all Step 5 leagues were compulsorily promoted to Step 4. Of the fourteen runners-up, the twelve clubs with the best PPG (points per game ratio) were also to be compulsorily promoted, but with resignations and mergers in leagues above, thirteen runners-up were promoted.

Teams at Step 5 without ground grading Grade F were to be relegated to Step 6, but no club in this division failed the ground grading process. All Step 5 leagues were fixed at 20 clubs for 2018–19, but in this case there were no further relegations or reprieves.

=== League table ===
Pos	Team	Pld	W	D	L	GF	GA	GD	Pts	Promotion or relegation
1	Blackfield & Langley (C, P)	42	31	7	4	118	28	+90	100	Promotion to the Southern League Division One South
2	Andover Town	42	32	3	7	116	56	+60	99	Refused promotion and demoted to Division One
3	Sholing	42	28	7	7	100	34	+66	91	
4	Horndean	42	24	7	11	94	55	+39	79	
5	Hamworthy United	42	24	4	14	83	72	+11	76	
6	AFC Portchester	42	23	5	14	81	53	+28	74	
7	Alresford Town	42	20	10	12	89	59	+30	70	
8	Lymington Town	42	20	11	11	82	57	+25	68 (Note: Lymington Town were deducted three points for fielding an ineligible player in their 2–1 win over Blackfield & Langley. Blackfield appealed, requesting the game be replayed, and their appeal was upheld.)	
9	Baffins Milton Rovers	42	20	5	17	85	77	+8	65	
10	Hamble Club	42	18	9	15	104	72	+32	63	
11	Bemerton Heath Harlequins	42	19	8	15	76	80	−4	62 (Note: Bemerton Heath Harlequins were deducted three points. Andover Town were initially promoted to the Southern League as runners-up, but refused promotion due to financial and other reasons. As a result they were demoted to Division One.)	
12	Shaftesbury	42	16	8	18	63	75	−12	56	
13	Brockenhurst	42	15	9	18	66	74	−8	54	
14	Bashley	42	15	7	20	77	87	−10	52	
15	Portland United	42	12	14	16	73	76	−3	50	
16	Fareham Town	42	15	5	22	77	92	−15	50	
17	Team Solent	42	12	10	20	95	107	−12	46	
18	Bournemouth	42	11	9	22	54	78	−24	42	
19	Cowes Sports	42	9	6	27	61	97	−36	33	
20	Amesbury Town (R)	42	8	5	29	64	130	−66	29	Relegation to Division One
21	Newport (IOW) (R)	42	7	5	30	49	117	−68	26	Relegation to Division One
22	Petersfield Town (R)	42	4	4	34	39	170	−131	16	Relegation to Division One

Updated to match(es) played on 16:36, 5 May 2018 (UTC). Source: thefa.com
Rules for classification: 1) points; 2) goal difference; 3) number of goals scored.
(C) Champions; (P) Promoted; (R) Relegated

== Division One ==
Division One was reduced from 21 to 19 clubs after Baffins Milton Rovers, Hamble Club and Shaftesbury were promoted to the Premier Division, Fleet Spurs were transferred to the Combined Counties League, and Pewsey Vale were transferred to the Hellenic League.

Three clubs joined the division:

- Fawley, relegated from the Premier Division.
- Verwood Town, relegated from the Premier Division.
- Whitchurch United, relegated from the Premier Division.

Reserve sides are not eligible for promotion to Step 5.

Step 6 clubs without ground grading Grade G were to be relegated to Step 7, but no club in this division failed the ground grading process. All Step 6 leagues were fixed at a maximum of 20 clubs for 2018–19, but in this case there were no further relegations or reprieves.

=== League table ===
Pos	Team	Pld	W	D	L	GF	GA	GD	Pts	Promotion
1	Christchurch (C, P)	34	23	8	3	88	33	+55	77	Promotion to the Premier Division
2	Andover New Street (P)	34	24	0	10	82	56	+26	72	Promotion to the Premier Division
3	Tadley Calleva (P)	34	22	4	8	96	45	+51	70	Promotion to the Premier Division
4	United Services Portsmouth	34	20	5	9	74	47	+27	65	
5	AFC Stoneham	34	18	8	8	75	38	+37	62	
6	Romsey Town	34	18	6	10	74	51	+23	60	
7	Laverstock & Ford	34	18	5	11	79	56	+23	59	
8	Alton	34	16	6	12	73	64	+9	54	
9	Fawley	34	16	3	15	53	56	−3	51	
10	New Milton Town	34	13	7	14	55	63	−8	46	
11	Ringwood Town	34	14	3	17	81	93	−12	45	
12	Downton	34	12	2	20	51	77	−26	38	
13	Whitchurch United	34	10	5	19	45	77	−32	35	
14	Totton & Eling	34	9	6	19	55	82	−27	33	
15	Hythe & Dibden	34	8	7	19	48	65	−17	31	
16	East Cowes Victoria Athletic	34	7	7	20	53	78	−25	28	
17	Verwood Town	34	8	3	23	47	83	−36	27	
18	Folland Sports	34	5	5	24	42	107	−65	17 (Note: Folland Sports had three points deducted.)	
19	Weymouth Reserves	0	0	0	0	0	0	0	0 (Note: Weymouth Reserves resigned from the Wessex League on 12 September 2017. Their record (P8 W2 D0 L6 GF11 GA21 Pts6) was subsequently expunged.)	Resigned, record expunged

Updated to match(es) played on 16:38, 5 May 2018 (UTC). Source: FA Full-Time, League Official
Rules for classification: 1) points; 2) goal difference; 3) number of goals scored.
(C) Champions; (P) Promoted
