= 2008–09 Wessex Football League =

Wessex Football League
- Season: 2008–09
- Champions: Poole Town

The 2008–09 Wessex Football League was the 23rd season of the Wessex Football League. The league champions for the first time in their history were Poole Town, who were denied promotion to the Southern League due to ground grading problems. VT were promoted as runners-up. There was the usual programme of promotion and relegation between the two Wessex League divisions.

For sponsorship reasons, the league was known as the Sydenhams Wessex League.

== League tables ==
=== Premier Division ===
The Premier Division consisted of 22 clubs, reduced from 23 the previous season, after A.F.C. Totton were promoted to the Southern League, and Downton and Ringwood Town were relegated to Division One. Two new clubs joined:

- Laverstock & Ford, runners-up in Division One.
- Newport (IOW), relegated from the Southern League.

| Pos | Team | Pld | W | D | L | GF | GA | GD | Pts | Qualification or relegation |
|---|---|---|---|---|---|---|---|---|---|---|
| 1 | Poole Town (C) | 42 | 38 | 2 | 2 | 144 | 34 | +110 | 116 | |
| 2 | VT (P) | 42 | 31 | 8 | 3 | 141 | 35 | +106 | 101 | Joined the Southern League |
| 3 | Moneyfields | 42 | 29 | 4 | 9 | 99 | 44 | +55 | 91 | |
| 4 | Wimborne Town | 42 | 26 | 9 | 7 | 115 | 41 | +74 | 87 | |
| 5 | Brockenhurst | 42 | 24 | 10 | 8 | 71 | 41 | +30 | 82 | |
| 6 | Newport (IOW) | 42 | 24 | 5 | 13 | 87 | 64 | +23 | 77 | |
| 7 | Christchurch | 42 | 22 | 8 | 12 | 77 | 48 | +29 | 74 | |
| 8 | Hamworthy United | 42 | 21 | 5 | 16 | 77 | 73 | +4 | 68 | |
| 9 | New Milton Town | 42 | 18 | 10 | 14 | 72 | 55 | +17 | 64 | |
| 10 | Fareham Town | 42 | 16 | 13 | 13 | 64 | 53 | +11 | 61 | |
| 11 | Romsey Town | 42 | 16 | 12 | 14 | 65 | 75 | −10 | 60 | |
| 12 | Bemerton Heath Harlequins | 42 | 16 | 5 | 21 | 56 | 67 | −11 | 53 | |
| 13 | Cowes Sports | 42 | 13 | 11 | 18 | 65 | 78 | −13 | 50 | |
| 14 | Brading Town | 42 | 13 | 8 | 21 | 62 | 70 | −8 | 47 | |
| 15 | Bournemouth | 42 | 12 | 8 | 22 | 60 | 89 | −29 | 44 | |
| 16 | Hayling United | 42 | 11 | 8 | 23 | 66 | 96 | −30 | 41 | |
| 17 | Alresford Town | 42 | 11 | 7 | 24 | 53 | 88 | −35 | 40 | |
| 18 | Lymington Town | 42 | 10 | 8 | 24 | 58 | 104 | −46 | 38 | |
| 19 | Alton Town | 42 | 9 | 9 | 24 | 56 | 105 | −49 | 36 | |
| 20 | Laverstock & Ford | 42 | 8 | 7 | 27 | 49 | 106 | −57 | 31 | |
| 21 | Hamble A.S.S.C. (R) | 42 | 5 | 6 | 31 | 30 | 121 | −91 | 21 | Relegated to Division One |
| 22 | Horndean (R) | 42 | 5 | 5 | 32 | 45 | 125 | −80 | 20 | Relegated to Division One |

(C) Champions; (P) Promoted; (R) Relegated

=== Division One ===
Division One consisted of 21 clubs, the same as the previous season, after Laverstock & Ford were promoted to the Premier Division, and Liss Athletic left the league. Two clubs were relegated from the Premier Division:

- Downton
- Ringwood Town

| Pos | Team | Pld | W | D | L | GF | GA | GD | Pts | Promotion |
|---|---|---|---|---|---|---|---|---|---|---|
| 1 | Totton & Eling (C, P) | 40 | 31 | 8 | 1 | 124 | 34 | +90 | 100 (Note: Totton & Eling had one point deducted.) | Promoted to the Premier Division |
| 2 | Blackfield & Langley (P) | 40 | 28 | 7 | 5 | 102 | 35 | +67 | 91 | Promoted to the Premier Division |
| 3 | United Services Portsmouth | 40 | 23 | 8 | 9 | 119 | 66 | +53 | 77 | |
| 4 | Petersfield Town | 40 | 22 | 10 | 8 | 86 | 56 | +30 | 76 | |
| 5 | Warminster Town | 40 | 22 | 8 | 10 | 98 | 47 | +51 | 74 | |
| 6 | Whitchurch United | 40 | 21 | 10 | 9 | 102 | 62 | +40 | 73 | |
| 7 | Hythe & Dibden | 40 | 19 | 10 | 11 | 101 | 78 | +23 | 67 | |
| 8 | Farnborough North End | 40 | 18 | 12 | 10 | 66 | 49 | +17 | 66 | |
| 9 | Fawley | 40 | 18 | 8 | 14 | 84 | 59 | +25 | 62 | |
| 10 | Stockbridge | 40 | 16 | 12 | 12 | 68 | 66 | +2 | 60 | |
| 11 | Ringwood Town | 40 | 17 | 6 | 17 | 86 | 80 | +6 | 57 | |
| 12 | Amesbury Town | 40 | 15 | 8 | 17 | 83 | 90 | −7 | 53 | |
| 13 | Verwood Town | 40 | 14 | 9 | 17 | 65 | 75 | −10 | 51 | |
| 14 | A.F.C. Aldermaston | 40 | 12 | 6 | 22 | 64 | 91 | −27 | 42 | |
| 15 | Shaftesbury | 40 | 11 | 9 | 20 | 61 | 92 | −31 | 42 | |
| 16 | Tadley Calleva | 40 | 11 | 6 | 23 | 66 | 102 | −36 | 39 | |
| 17 | Downton | 40 | 9 | 10 | 21 | 56 | 91 | −35 | 37 | |
| 18 | East Cowes Victoria Athletic | 40 | 8 | 8 | 24 | 48 | 109 | −61 | 32 | |
| 19 | A.F.C. Portchester | 40 | 6 | 11 | 23 | 49 | 106 | −57 | 29 | |
| 20 | Andover New Street | 40 | 7 | 6 | 27 | 58 | 111 | −53 | 27 | |
| 21 | Fleet Spurs | 40 | 3 | 6 | 31 | 36 | 123 | −87 | 15 | |

(C) Champions; (P) Promoted
