= 2010–11 Wessex Football League =

Wessex Football League
- Season: 2010–11
- Champions: Poole Town

The 2010–11 Wessex Football League was the 25th season of the Wessex Football League. The league champions for the third time in succession were Poole Town, who were promoted to the Southern League after being denied the previous two seasons due to ground grading problems. There was the usual programme of promotion and relegation between the two Wessex League divisions.

For sponsorship reasons, the league was known as the Sydenhams Wessex League.

== League tables ==
=== Premier Division ===
The Premier Division consisted of 22 clubs, the same as the previous season, after Wimborne Town were promoted to the Southern League, and Cowes Sports were relegated to Division One. Two new clubs joined:

- Fawley, runners-up in Division One.
- Hamble A.S.S.C., champions of Division One.

Pos	Team	Pld	W	D	L	GF	GA	GD	Pts	Qualification or relegation
1	Poole Town (C, P)	42	33	5	4	132	44	+88	104	Joined the Southern League
2	Bemerton Heath Harlequins	42	26	6	10	89	52	+37	84	
3	Winchester City	42	25	8	9	84	52	+32	83	
4	Brading Town	42	24	10	8	87	56	+31	82	
5	Bournemouth	42	23	11	8	100	43	+57	80	
6	Christchurch	42	21	12	9	86	60	+26	75	
7	Moneyfields	42	21	7	14	75	62	+13	70	
8	Fareham Town	42	19	10	13	76	69	+7	67	
9	Hamworthy United	42	19	9	14	88	70	+18	66	
10	Newport (IOW)	42	17	9	16	70	65	+5	60	
11	Lymington Town	42	18	5	19	77	79	−2	59	
12	Hamble A.S.S.C.	42	16	8	18	91	75	+16	56	
13	Alton Town	42	16	8	18	80	86	−6	56	
14	Blackfield & Langley	42	16	7	19	55	62	−7	55	
15	Alresford Town	42	13	6	23	82	84	−2	45	
16	Romsey Town	42	11	11	20	59	87	−28	44	
17	Laverstock & Ford	42	12	7	23	68	105	−37	43	
18	Totton & Eling	42	11	9	22	67	88	−21	42	
19	New Milton Town	42	10	7	25	56	104	−48	37	
20	Fawley	42	10	4	28	45	112	−67	34	
21	Hayling United	42	9	4	29	69	130	−61	31	
22	Brockenhurst (R)	42	8	5	29	56	107	−51	29	Relegated to Division One

(C) Champions; (P) Promoted; (R) Relegated

=== Division One ===
Division One consisted of 19 clubs, reduced from 21 the previous season, after Hamble A.S.S.C. and Fawley were promoted to the Premier Division, Farnborough North End transferred to the Combined Counties League and A.F.C. Aldermaston were relegated to the Hampshire League. Two clubs joined:

- Cowes Sports, relegated from the Premier Division.
- Pewsey Vale, joining from the Wiltshire League.

Pos	Team	Pld	W	D	L	GF	GA	GD	Pts	Promotion or relegation
1	Downton (C, P)	36	27	7	2	106	29	+77	88	Promoted to the Premier Division
2	Horndean (P)	36	25	4	7	104	53	+51	79	Promoted to the Premier Division
3	A.F.C. Portchester	36	20	9	7	85	52	+33	69	
4	Pewsey Vale	36	20	9	7	77	44	+33	69	
5	United Services Portsmouth	36	20	7	9	90	57	+33	67	
6	Ringwood Town	36	18	5	13	61	60	+1	59	
7	Whitchurch United	36	17	4	15	77	54	+23	55	
8	Cowes Sports	36	15	8	13	59	62	−3	52 (Note: Cowes Sports had one point deducted.)	
9	Verwood Town	36	13	11	12	70	66	+4	50	
10	Fleet Spurs	36	15	3	18	82	85	−3	48	
11	Petersfield Town	36	12	9	15	68	73	−5	45	
12	Warminster Town	36	13	6	17	72	79	−7	45	
13	Amesbury Town	36	14	3	19	62	90	−28	45	
14	Hythe & Dibden	36	9	9	18	60	72	−12	36	
15	East Cowes Victoria Athletic	36	9	9	18	52	77	−25	36	
16	Tadley Calleva	36	11	3	22	69	101	−32	36	
17	Andover New Street	36	10	6	20	60	93	−33	36	
18	Stockbridge	36	5	9	22	44	95	−51	24	
19	Shaftesbury (R)	36	4	9	23	39	95	−56	21	Relegated to the Dorset Premier League

(C) Champions; (P) Promoted; (R) Relegated
