= 2018–19 Wessex Football League =

Wessex Football League
- Season: 2018–19

The 2018–19 Wessex Football League season (known as the Sydenhams Football League (Wessex) for sponsorship reasons) is the 33rd in the history of the Wessex Football League since its establishment in 1986. The league consists of two divisions: the Premier Division and Division One.

The constitution was announced on 25 May 2018. Only one promotional spot from the Premier Division, to the Southern League Division One South and West, was available.

Sholing won the league with eight matches remaining, eventually breaking several records on the way, including biggest points gap to the runners up (31 points), and record points per game ratio (2.763).

== Premier Division ==
The Premier Division is reduced from 22 clubs to 20 after Blackfield & Langley were promoted to the Southern League, Amesbury Town, Newport (IOW) and Petersfield Town were relegated to Division One, and Andover Town were demoted to Division One for refusing promotion to the Southern League. Three teams joined the division:

- Andover New Street, runners-up in Division One.
- Christchurch, champions of Division One.
- Tadley Calleva, third-placed club in Division One.

=== League table ===
Pos	Team	Pld	W	D	L	GF	GA	GD	Pts	Promotion or relegation
1	Sholing (C, P)	38	34	3	1	117	24	+93	105	Promotion to the Southern League Division One South
2	Horndean	38	22	8	8	93	44	+49	74	
3	Bournemouth	38	19	10	9	85	64	+21	67	
4	Portland United	38	20	3	15	80	63	+17	63	
5	Baffins Milton Rovers	38	16	10	12	67	51	+16	58	
6	Hamworthy United	38	18	4	16	83	72	+11	58	
7	Hamble Club	38	17	7	14	60	52	+8	58	
8	Tadley Calleva	38	14	10	14	61	68	−7	52	
9	Bashley	38	16	6	16	69	71	−2	51 (Note: Bashley had three points deducted.)	
10	Lymington Town	38	14	9	15	68	72	−4	51	
11	Team Solent	38	14	8	16	83	77	+6	50	
12	Alresford Town	38	15	5	18	70	71	−1	50	
13	AFC Portchester	38	14	8	16	66	69	−3	50	
14	Shaftesbury	38	14	6	18	57	59	−2	48	
15	Brockenhurst	38	14	5	19	48	65	−17	47	
16	Christchurch	38	12	10	16	52	63	−11	46	
17	Fareham Town	38	12	10	16	51	78	−27	46	
18	Cowes Sports	38	11	4	23	43	87	−44	37	
19	Bemerton Heath Harlequins (R)	38	7	10	21	45	81	−36	31	Relegation to Division One
20	Andover New Street (R)	38	7	4	27	36	103	−67	25	Relegation to Division One

Updated to match(es) played on 01:12, 23 April 2019 (UTC). Source: thefa.com
Rules for classification: 1) points; 2) goal difference; 3) number of goals scored.
(C) Champions; (P) Promoted; (R) Relegated

== Division One ==
Division One remains at 19 clubs after Christchurch, Andover New Street and Tadley Calleva were promoted to the Premier Division, and Weymouth Reserves left the league. Four clubs joined the division:

- Amesbury Town, relegated from the Premier Division.
- Andover Town, demoted from the Premier Division.
- Newport (IOW), relegated from the Premier Division.
- Petersfield Town, relegated from the Premier Division.

=== League table ===
Pos	Team	Pld	W	D	L	GF	GA	GD	Pts	Promotion
1	AFC Stoneham (C, P)	36	26	6	4	124	42	+82	84	Promotion to the Premier Division
2	Amesbury Town (P)	36	26	6	4	107	46	+61	84	Promotion to the Premier Division
3	Hythe & Dibden	36	25	8	3	105	42	+63	83	
4	Romsey Town	36	26	3	7	103	44	+59	81	
5	United Services Portsmouth	36	20	7	9	92	63	+29	67	
6	Newport (IOW)	36	16	5	15	64	60	+4	53	
7	Downton	36	14	9	13	67	68	−1	51	
8	Verwood Town	36	13	9	14	47	64	−17	48	
9	Laverstock & Ford	36	13	7	16	70	71	−1	46	
10	East Cowes Victoria Athletic	36	11	12	13	60	77	−17	45	
11	Fawley	36	14	5	17	55	63	−8	44 (Note: Alton and Fawley each had three points deducted. Newport (IOW) v Alton on 22 April 2019 was declared a home walkover.)	
12	Ringwood Town	36	12	7	17	52	77	−25	43	
13	Alton	36	13	5	18	72	81	−9	41	
14	Whitchurch United	36	12	5	19	53	80	−27	41	
15	Petersfield Town	36	11	7	18	56	75	−19	40	
16	Folland Sports	36	9	4	23	53	109	−56	31	
17	New Milton Town	36	8	4	24	44	81	−37	28	
18	Andover Town	36	8	2	26	51	100	−49	26 (Note: Andover Town and Totton & Eling were reprieved from relegation)	
19	Totton & Eling	36	6	7	23	48	80	−32	25	

Updated to match(es) played on 23:29, 25 April 2019 (UTC). Source: FA Full-Time, League Official
Rules for classification: 1) points; 2) goal difference; 3) number of goals scored.
(C) Champions; (P) Promoted
