= 2019–20 Wessex Football League =

Wessex Football League
- Season: 2019–20
- Champions: none
- Relegated: none

The 2019–20 Wessex Football League season (known as the Sydenhams Football League (Wessex) for sponsorship reasons) was the 34th in the history of the Wessex Football League since its establishment in 1986. The league consisted of two divisions: the Premier Division and Division One. The season was abandoned on 26 March 2020, due to the COVID-19 pandemic.

The constitution was announced on 19 May 2019. This season, the Premier Division champions were to be promoted to Step 4. The runners-up in this division and ten other Step 5 divisions in other leagues were to be ranked according to PPG (points per game), and the top four in that ranking would also have been promoted. The remaining seven runners-up would have competed in "winner takes all" play-offs with seven clubs finishing bottom in Step 4 leagues, the winners being placed at Step 4 and the losers at Step 5 for 2020–21.

The bottom clubs in all 14 Step 5 divisions were to be ranked according to PPG, and the 12 lowest-ranked clubs were to be relegated to Step 6.

In Division One, the top four clubs were to be promoted to Step 5, with the bottom two liable to relegation to Step 7.

== League suspension and abandonment ==
Despite other leagues suspending all matches from 13 March due to the COVID-19 pandemic, the Wessex League continued to hold matches on 14 March. On 16 March, the Football Association decided to postpone all matches across all their competitions until 3 April, and a league statement confirmed the postponement of all matches for the foreseeable future.

On 26 March 2020, the league season was formally abandoned, with all results being expunged, and no promotion or relegation taking place to, from, or between the two divisions. On 30 March, sixty-six non-league clubs sent an open letter to the Football Association requesting that they reconsider their decision.

== Premier Division ==
The Premier Division remained at 20 clubs after Sholing were promoted to the Southern League, and Andover New Street and Bemerton Heath Harlequins were relegated to Division One. Three teams joined the division:

- AFC Stoneham, champions of Division One.
- Amesbury Town, runners-up in Division One.
- Fleet Town, relegated from the Southern League Division One South.

Team Solent F.C. were renamed Solent University F.C.

=== League table at the time of abandonment ===
Pos	Team	Pld	W	D	L	GF	GA	GD	Pts	Promotion or relegation
1	Alresford Town	30	22	2	6	74	41	+33	68	
2	AFC Stoneham	31	20	4	7	67	35	+32	64	
3	AFC Portchester	28	19	2	7	72	40	+32	59	
4	Christchurch	26	18	3	5	58	20	+38	57	
5	Lymington Town	30	16	4	10	67	44	+23	52	
6	Horndean	28	14	8	6	63	38	+25	50	
7	Bashley	29	15	3	11	58	41	+17	48	
8	Fareham Town	27	15	5	7	69	46	+23	47 (Note: Fareham Town had three points deducted.)	
9	Hamworthy United	31	14	5	12	70	57	+13	47	
10	Hamble Club	30	14	4	12	47	51	−4	46	
11	Portland United	27	13	5	9	65	42	+23	44	
12	Fleet Town	29	10	7	12	58	53	+5	37	
13	Tadley Calleva	28	11	3	14	48	59	−11	36	
14	Baffins Milton Rovers	23	11	2	10	44	40	+4	35	
15	Brockenhurst	28	10	4	14	51	49	+2	34	
16	Shaftesbury	30	7	3	20	38	79	−41	24	
17	Solent University	28	5	5	18	46	97	−51	20	Resigned from the league after the abandonment
18	Bournemouth	27	4	4	19	23	65	−42	16	
19	Cowes Sports	30	3	5	22	39	84	−45	14	
20	Amesbury Town	28	3	2	23	30	106	−76	8 (Note: Amesbury Town had three points deducted.)	

Updated to match(es) played on 20:33, 15 March 2020 (UTC). Source: http://full-time.thefa.com/Index.do?league=274386
Rules for classification: 1) points; 2) goal difference; 3) number of goals scored.

== Division One ==
Division One was increased from 19 clubs to 20 after AFC Stoneham and Amesbury Town were promoted to the Premier Division. Three clubs joined the division:

- Andover New Street, relegated from the Premier Division.
- Bemerton Heath Harlequins, relegated from the Premier Division.
- Pewsey Vale, transferred from Hellenic League Division One West.

=== League table at the time of abandonment ===
Pos	Team	Pld	W	D	L	GF	GA	GD	Pts	Promotion or relegation
1	United Services Portsmouth	28	20	4	4	86	33	+53	64	
2	Andover New Street	25	18	3	4	75	44	+31	57	
3	Bemerton Heath Harlequins	28	17	3	8	80	38	+42	54	
4	Hythe & Dibden	24	16	6	2	67	29	+38	54	
5	Downton	28	16	5	7	62	40	+22	53	
6	Alton	28	15	5	8	54	44	+10	50	
7	Newport (IOW)	26	15	3	8	73	36	+37	48	
8	Whitchurch United	31	12	3	16	55	59	−4	39	
9	Laverstock & Ford	25	11	5	9	53	43	+10	38	
10	Petersfield Town	25	9	8	8	33	27	+6	35	
11	Andover Town	31	9	8	14	42	57	−15	35	
12	Verwood Town	27	9	6	12	47	58	−11	33	
13	Romsey Town	24	9	4	11	54	60	−6	31	
14	Ringwood Town	29	6	10	13	50	66	−16	28	
15	Fawley	29	6	6	17	43	69	−26	24	
16	New Milton Town	29	4	10	15	29	71	−42	22	
17	East Cowes Victoria Athletic	25	5	5	15	30	64	−34	20	
18	Totton & Eling	22	5	3	14	24	55	−31	18	
19	Folland Sports	28	3	5	20	29	93	−64	14	
20	Pewsey Vale	0	0	0	0	0	0	0	0	Resigned from the league

Updated to match(es) played on 20:37, 15 March 2020 (UTC). Source: FA Full-Time, League Official
Pewsey Vale resigned from the league in November 2019, and their record of P14 W1 D1 L12 GF10 GA61 Pts4 was subsequently expunged
Rules for classification: 1) points; 2) goal difference; 3) number of goals scored.
