= Jo Tessem =

Norwegian footballer and manager (born 1972)

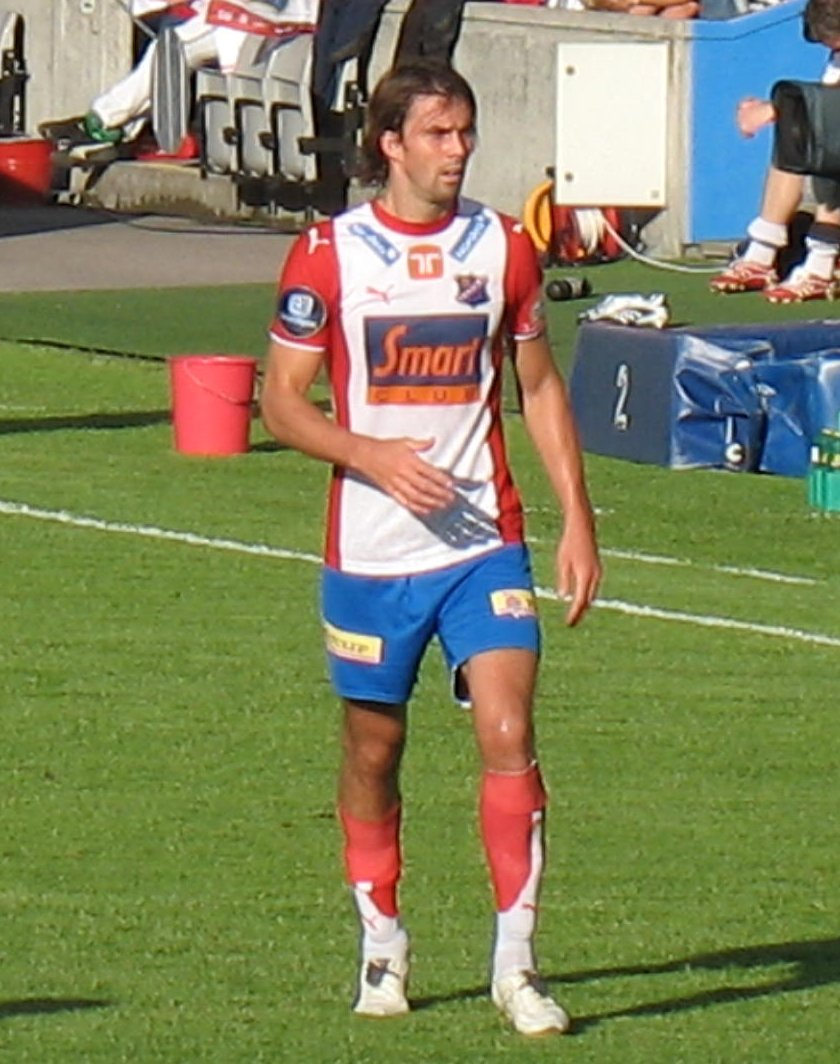

Personal information
- Date of birth: 28 February 1972 (age 54)
- Place of birth: Ørland Municipality, Norway
- Height: 1.91 m (6 ft 3 in)
- Position: Midfielder

Senior career*
Years	Team	Apps	(Gls)
	Ørland	?	(?)
1994–1997	Lyn	83	(31)
1998–1999	Molde	52	(14)
1999–2005	Southampton	110	(12)
2004	→ Lyn (loan)	12	(2)
2004	→ Millwall (loan)	12	(1)
2005–2007	Lyn	75	(12)
2008	AFC Bournemouth	11	(0)
2010	Eastleigh	4	(0)
2010–2018	Totton & Eling	118	(7)
2018–2022	Hythe & Dibden	56	(11)
Total		521	(90)

International career
2002	Norway B	1	(0)
2001–2004	Norway	9	(0)

Managerial career
- 2008–2009: Totton & Eling
- * Club domestic league appearances and goals as of 14:17, 22 April 2022 (UTC)

Jo Tessem (born 28 February 1972) is a Norwegian former professional footballer who played as a midfielder. Tessem was known for his versatility as a player, being able to play anywhere on the pitch.

== Playing career ==
=== Norway ===
Tessem hails from Brekstad in Sør-Trøndelag, and his original club was Ørland BK. He played for this club in the lower divisions, but concentrated more on his professional career. He served in the Norwegian Armed Forces for a period, and worked at Værnes Air Station. He trained with local team Stjørdals-Blink at the time, but did not sign any contract. When enrolling at the Norwegian Police University College in Oslo in 1994, he needed to stay in shape and began training with Lyn, who were playing in the 1st Division at the time. He quickly showed off his talent, and was offered a professional contract. In the 1996-season, Tessem scored 15 goals in 22 matches, helping Lyn earn promotion to the highest division.

After four years in Oslo, Tessem transferred to Molde after the 1997 season. While playing here, he also worked part-time as a police officer.

=== Southampton ===
He was signed by Dave Jones for Southampton for £600,000 in 1999, and made his debut on 20 November 1999 at home to Tottenham Hotspur playing an unfamiliar role as right-back in place of the injured Jason Dodd. Although he was a midfielder he was extremely versatile and was often played as a striker in partnership with James Beattie.

He was a regular player up to the 2002–03 season and played in the FA Cup final against Arsenal on 17 May 2003, coming on as a late substitute for Anders Svensson. His final tally for the Saints was 130 matches and 16 goals.

=== Back to Norway ===
Tessem returned to Lyn on loan for the first half of the 2004 season in Norway. He was then loaned out to Millwall where he scored once against Cardiff, before signing a three-year contract with Lyn at the start of the 2005 season. During the 2007 season, Jo Tessem announced that he was moving back to England after the season, because his wife was English, and they had decided to live there. He played 208 matches for Lyn from his debut in 1994 until he ended his Lyn Oslo relationship after the 2007 season.

He played for Lyn in the Norwegian Premier League in 2007, before deciding to move back to England, where his partner was born.

=== AFC Bournemouth ===
On 8 January 2008, Tessem joined AFC Bournemouth on a short-term deal. He had trained with the squad for over a month before signing. Kevin Bond, the manager, said: "Jo has bags of experience. He's been playing the last two seasons in Norway, so he's been getting regular football and is still very fit. He doesn't miss anything on the ball and he uses it very well. His last season didn't end until November, so he's in good shape and ready to go. Hopefully, it'll prove an ideal move for us, as well as him."

Bournemouth were relegated to League Two after five successive seasons of League One football. Tessem had been playing under month-to-month contracts since joining the team, but Bournemouth could not offer a new contract by the end of the season due to their uncertain financial future.

In June 2009 Tessem went on trial at the Swedish club Örgryte IS in Allsvenskan. Due to an injury he did not sign a contract with the club. Only six days after he discontinued the negotiations with Örgryte Tessem went to England for a trial with Southampton in League One.

=== Totton & Eling ===
Tessem managed Wessex League side Totton & Eling in 2008–2009, winning the league with 100 points.

=== Eastleigh ===
Tessem signed for Eastleigh in February 2010. After 4 appearances Tessem left the club later in the month.

=== Totton & Eling ===
Tessem returned to Wessex League side Totton & Eling in summer 2010 in order to play for the club.

=== Hythe & Dibden ===
Having played several matches at the end of the 2017–18 season for the club, Tessem rejoined Wessex League Division One side Hythe & Dibden. He made 27 league appearances during the 2018–19 season, scoring ten goals.

== Media career ==
On 14 July 2022, it was announced he would join BBC Radio Solent, commentating on Southampton matches.

== Career statistics ==
As of match played 27 September 2022

Appearances and goals by club, season and competition
Club	Season	League			FA Cup		League Cup		Other		Total	
Club	Season	Division	Apps	Goals	Apps	Goals	Apps	Goals	Apps	Goals	Apps	Goals
Lyn
Lyn	1994	1. divisjon (Group 1)	14	3	5 (Note: Appearances in Norwegian Football Cup)	4	—		—		19	7
Lyn	1995	1. divisjon (Group 2)	21	5	6	3	—		—		27	8
Lyn	1996	1. divisjon (Group 1)	22	15	3	3	—		—		25	18
Lyn	1997	Tippeligaen	26	8	3	0	—		—		29	8
Lyn	Total		83	31	17	10	0	0	0	0	100	41
Molde
Molde	1998	Tippeligaen	26	8	3	0	—		2 (Note: Appearances in UEFA Cup)	0	31	8
Molde	1999	Tippeligaen	26	6	5	0	—		10 (Note: Appearances in Champions League)	1	41	7
Molde	Total		52	14	8	0	0	0	12	1	72	15
Southampton
Southampton	1999–2000	Premier League	25	4	2	0	1	0	—		28	4
Southampton	2000–01	Premier League	33	4	4	1	2	1	—		39	6
Southampton	2001–02	Premier League	22	2	0	0	2	0	—		24	2
Southampton	2002–03	Premier League	27	2	7	2	1	0	—		35	4
Southampton	2003–04	Premier League	3	0	0	0	0	0	1	0	4	0
Southampton	Total		110	12	13	3	6	1	1	0	130	16
Lyn (loan)	2004	Tippeligaen	12	2	4	0	—		—		16	2
Millwall (loan)	2004–05	Championship	12	1	0	0	1	0	—		13	1
Lyn
Lyn	2005	Tippeligaen	26	8	3	1	—		—		29	9
Lyn	2006	Tippeligaen	25	2	3	1	—		1	1	29	4
Lyn	2007	Tippeligaen	24	2	2	0	—		—		26	2
Lyn	Total		75	12	8	2	0	0	1	1	84	15
Bournemouth	2007–08	League One	11	0	0	0	0	0	—		11	0
Eastleigh	2009–10	Conference South	4	0	0	0	—		—		4	0
Totton & Eling
Totton & Eling	2010–11	Wessex Premier Division	15	3	—		—		1 (Note: Appearances in Wessex League Cup)	1	16	4
Totton & Eling	2011–12	Wessex Premier Division	13	0	—		—		0	0	13	0
Totton & Eling	2012–13	Wessex Premier Division	12	0	—		—		1	0	13	0
Totton & Eling	2014–15	Wessex Premier Division	21	3	—		—		1	0	22	3
Totton & Eling	2015–16	Wessex Division One	23	1	—		—		1	0	24	1
Totton & Eling	2016–17	Wessex Division One	26	0	—		—		1 (Note: Appearances in Southampton Senior Cup)	0	27	0
Totton & Eling	2017–18	Wessex Division One	8	0	—		—		1 (Note: Appearances in Hampshire Senior Cup)	0	9	0
Totton & Eling	Total		118	7	0	0	0	0	6	1	124	8
Hythe & Dibden
Hythe & Dibden	2017–18	Wessex Division One	9	0	—		—		0	0	9	0
Hythe & Dibden	2018–19	Wessex Division One	26	10	—		—		2 (Note: Appearances in Wessex League Cup (1 appearance), Southampton Senior Cup (1 appearance))	0	28	10
Hythe & Dibden	2019–20	Wessex Division One	5	0	2	0	—		4 (Note: Appearances in FA Vase (1 appearance, 1 goal), Bournemouth Senior Cup (1 appearance), Hampshire Senior Cup (1 appearance), Russell Cotes Cup (1 appearance))	1	11	1
Hythe & Dibden	2020–21	Wessex Division One	4	0	—		—		1	0	5	0
Hythe & Dibden	2021–22	Wessex Premier Division	10	1	—		—		0	0	10	1
Hythe & Dibden	2022–23	Wessex Premier Division	0	0	—		—		1 (Note: Appearances in Southampton Senior Cup)	0	1	0
Hythe & Dibden	Total		54	11	2	0	0	0	8	1	64	12
Career total			531	90	52	15	7	1	28	4	618	110

== International career ==
Tessem has nine caps for Norway, earning his first cap on his 29th birthday in February 2001.

== Honours ==
Southampton

- FA Cup runner-up: 2002–03

FC Lyn Oslo

- Norwegian Cup runner-up: 1994, 2004
