= Alresford Town F.C. =

Association football club in England

Coordinates: 51°05′18.79″N 1°10′08.41″W

- Full name: Alresford Town Football Club
- Nickname: The Magpies
- Founded: 1898
- Ground: Alrebury Park, New Alresford
- Chairman: Craig Scriven
- Manager: Ross Holt
- League: Wessex League Division One
- 2025–26: Wessex League Division One, 17th of 22
Home colours	Away colours

Alresford Town Football Club is a football club based in New Alresford, Hampshire, England. Affiliated to the Hampshire FA, they are currently members of the Wessex League Division One and play at Alrebury Park.

== History ==
The original Alresford Town was established in 1898 and were members of the Winchester & District League. The modern club was established in 1989 and joined the North Hants League. After finishing as runners-up in their first season, they moved up to Division Two of the Hampshire League. The club were Division Two runners-up in 1990–91, securing a second successive promotion to Division One. However, after finishing second-from-bottom of Division One in 1994–95, they were relegated back to Division Two. At the end of the following season the club left to rejoin the North Hants League.

Alresford were North Hants League champions in 1999–2000 and returned to Division Two of the Hampshire League. After finishing second in Division Two in 2001–02 they were promoted to Division One. In 2004 the Hampshire League merged into the Wessex League, with the club becoming members of the new Division Two. The division was renamed Division One in 2006 and Alresford were runners-up in 2006–07, earning promotion to the Premier Division. After five seasons in the lower-mid table, the club were Premier Division runners-up in 2012–13, a season that saw them win the Hampshire League (beating AFC Bournemouth in the final), the Wessex League Cup and the North Hants Senior Cup. They were Premier Division runners-up again the following season, also retaining the League Cup and the North Hants Senior Cup, as well as winning the Aldershot Senior Cup.

In 2018–19 Alresford won the Southampton Senior Cup, beating AFC Stoneham 3–0 in the final. The 2019–20 season was abandoned due to the coronavirus pandemic with Alresford top of the Premier Division. In 2022–23 they finished bottom of the Premier Division and were relegated to Division One. In 2023–24 the club finished fourth in Division One, qualifying for the promotion play-offs, in which they lost 2–0 to Downton in the semi-finals. A third-place finish in 2024–25 was followed by a 2–1 loss to East Cowes Victoria in the play-off semi-finals.

=== Season-by-season record ===
Season	Division	Position	Significant events
1989–90	North Hants League	2	Promoted
1990–91	Hampshire League Division Two	2/18	Promoted
1991–92	Hampshire League Division One	15/18	
1992–93	Hampshire League Division One	15/17	
1993–94	Hampshire League Division One	16/20	
1994–95	Hampshire League Division One	19/20	Relegated
1995–96	Hampshire League Division Two	16/18	Relegated
1996–97	North Hants League		
1997–98	North Hants League		
1998–99	North Hants League		
1999–2000	North Hants League	1	Champions, promoted
2000–01	Hampshire League Division Two	3/16	
2001–02	Hampshire League Division Two	2/16	Promoted
2002–03	Hampshire League Division One	11/15	
2003–04	Hampshire League Division One	8/14	
2004–05	Wessex League Division Two	10/22	
2005–06	Wessex League Division Two	20/22	
2006–07	Wessex League Division One	2/19	Promoted
2007–08	Wessex League Premier Division	21/23	
2008–09	Wessex League Premier Division	17/22	
2009–10	Wessex League Premier Division	17/22	
2010–11	Wessex League Premier Division	15/22	
2011–12	Wessex League Premier Division	15/22	
2012–13	Wessex League Premier Division	2/21	
2013–14	Wessex League Premier Division	2/22	
2014–15	Wessex League Premier Division	16/21	
2015–16	Wessex League Premier Division	20/21	
2016–17	Wessex League Premier Division	5/22	
2017–18	Wessex League Premier Division	7/22	
2018–19	Wessex League Premier Division	12/22	
2019–20	Wessex League Premier Division	14/21	Season abandoned due to COVID-19 pandemic
2020–21	Wessex League Premier Division	–	Season curtailed due to COVID-19 pandemic
2021–22	Wessex League Premier Division	14/21	
2022–23	Wessex League Premier Division	20/20	Relegated
2023–24	Wessex League Division One	4/21	Lost in play-off semi-finals
2024–25	Wessex League Division One	3/20	Lost in play-off semi-finals

== Honours ==
- Wessex League
  - League Cup winners 2012–13, 2013–14
- North Hants League
  - Champions 1999–2000
- Hampshire Senior Cup
  - Winners 2012–13
- North Hants Senior Cup
  - Winners 2012–13, 2013–14
- Aldershot Senior Cup
  - Winners 2013–14
- Southampton Senior Cup
  - Winners 2018–19

== Records ==
- Best FA Cup performance: Second qualifying round, 2016–17
- Best FA Vase performance: Fourth round, 2013–14
- Record attendance: 603 vs Aldershot Town, Hampshire Senior Cup, 22 September 2026

== See also ==
- Alresford Town F.C. players
