= Amesbury Town F.C. =

Association football club in England

Amesbury Town
- Full name: Amesbury Town Football Club
- Nickname: The Blues
- Founded: 1904
- Ground: Bonnymead Park, Amesbury
- Chairman: Gino Nardiello
- Manager: Danny Harrison
- League: Wessex League Division One
- 2025–26: Wessex League Division One, 11th of 22
| Home colours | Away colours | Third colours |

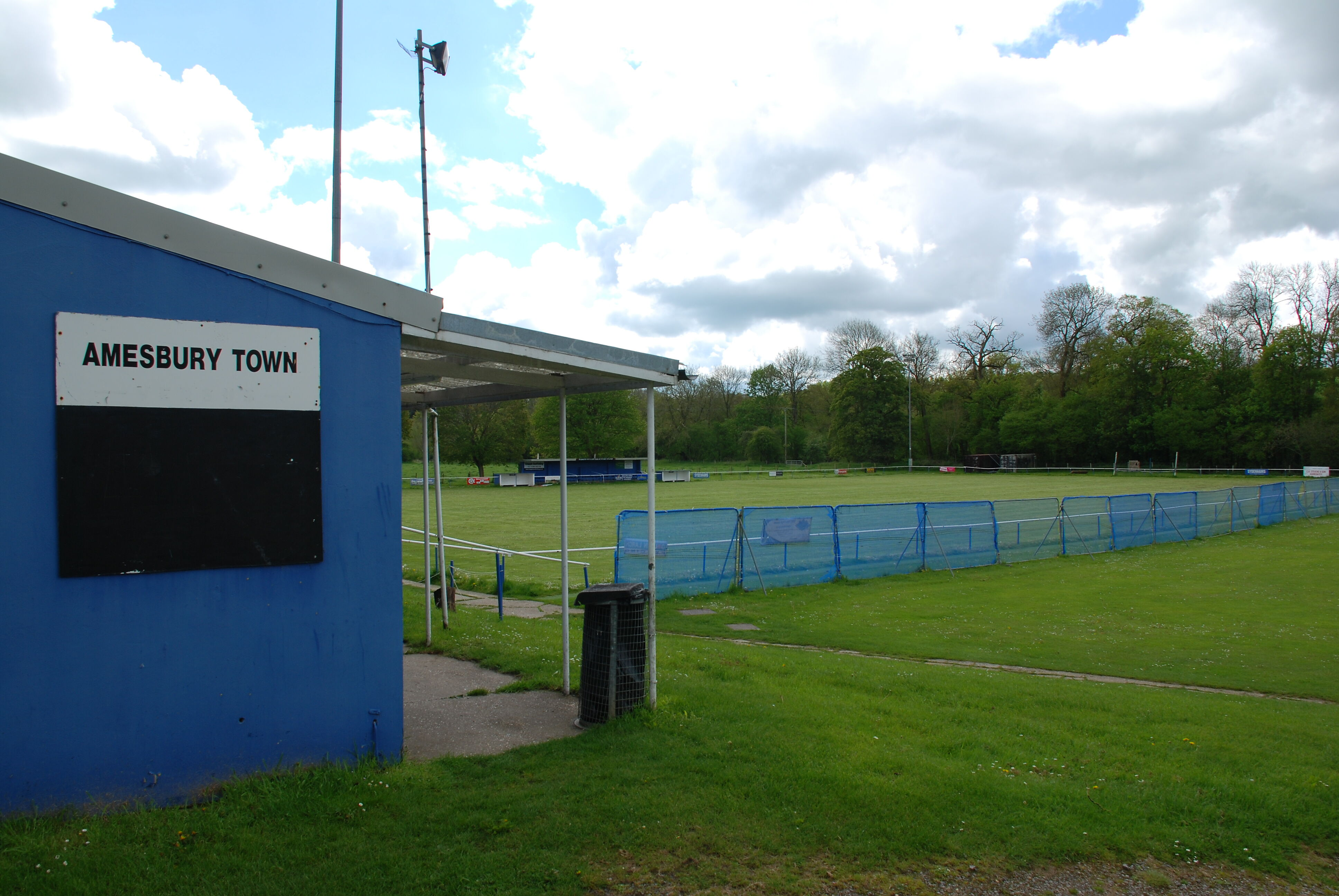
Bonnymead Park

Amesbury Town Football Club is a football club based in Amesbury, Wiltshire, England. They are currently members of the Wessex League Division One and play at Bonnymead Park.

== History ==
The club was established in 1904 as Amesbury Football Club. They joined the Salisbury & District Junior League, before becoming members of the Salisbury & District League in 1906. After winning the league in 1955–56, they became members of Division One of the Wiltshire League. However, after finishing third in Division One in 1958–59, the club left the division. They returned to Division One in 1972–73; despite finishing bottom of the table, they were not relegated. The following season saw them finish second-from-bottom of the division, but in 1974–75 they were league champions. They were runners-up the following season, and were placed in Senior Division One in 1976 after the league merged with the Wiltshire Combination to form the Wiltshire County League.

Amesbury began entering the FA Vase in 1978–79, and were Division One runners-up. The following season saw them win the league and reach the third round of the Vase. In 1983–84 they won the Wiltshire Senior Cup for the first time. The club were renamed Amesbury Town in 1984, and after finishing second in 1989–90, they were champions in 1990–91. They retained the league title in 1991–92, and after finishing as runners-up in 1993–94, also winning the Wiltshire Senior Cup, the club moved up to Division One of the Western League. However, after finishing bottom of Division One in 1996–97 they left to rejoin the Salisbury & District League.

After finishing as runners-up in the Salisbury & District League Premier Division in 1997–98, Amesbury joined Division Three of the Hampshire League. A fourth-place finish in their first season in the league was enough to earn promotion to the Premier Division amidst league reorganisation, and they went on to win the Premier Division at the first attempt. In 2004 the league merged into the Wessex League, with the club becoming members of Division Two, which was renamed Division One in 2006. In 2015–16 they were Division One runners-up, and were promoted to the Premier Division. After finishing third-from-bottom of the Premier Division in 2017–18, the club were relegated back to Division One. They were Division One runners-up the following season, making an immediate return to the Premier Division. However, they finished bottom of the Premier Division in 2021–22 and were relegated to Division One. Following a second-from-bottom finish in Division One the season after, they were relegated to the Premier Division of the Wiltshire League.

In 2023–24 Amesbury were Wiltshire League Premier Division champions, earning promotion back to Division One of the Wessex League at the first attempt.

=== Season-by-season record ===
| Season | Division | Position | Significant events |
|---|---|---|---|
| 1904–05 | Salisbury & District Junior League | | |
| 1905–06 | Salisbury & District Junior League | 4 | |
| 1906–07 | Salisbury & District League | | |
| 1907–08 | Salisbury & District League | | |
| 1908–09 | Salisbury & District League | | |
| 1909–10 | Salisbury & District League | | |
| 1910–11 | Salisbury & District League | | |
| 1911–12 | Salisbury & District League | | |
| 1912–13 | Salisbury & District League | | |
| 1913–14 | Salisbury & District League | | |
| 1914–15 | Salisbury & District League | | |
| 1919–20 | Salisbury & District League Division Two | 7 | |
| 1920–21 | Salisbury & District League | | |
| 1921–22 | Salisbury & District League | | |
| 1922–23 | Salisbury & District League | | |
| 1923–24 | Salisbury & District League Division Two A | 10 | |
| 1924–25 | Salisbury & District League Division Two A | 6 | |
| 1925–26 | Salisbury & District League Division Two A | 6 | |
| 1926–27 | Salisbury & District League Division Two A | 3 | |
| 1927–28 | Salisbury & District League Division Two A | 8 | |
| 1928–29 | Salisbury & District League Division Two A | 8 | |
| 1929–30 | Salisbury & District League Division One A | 7 | |
| 1930–31 | Salisbury & District League Division One A | 8 | |
| 1931–32 | Salisbury & District League Division One A | 7 | |
| 1932–33 | Salisbury & District League Division One A | 7 | |
| 1933–34 | Salisbury & District League Division One A | | |
| 1934–35 | Salisbury & District League Division Two A | 4 | |
| 1935–36 | Salisbury & District League Division Two A | 3 | |
| 1936–37 | Salisbury & District League Division Two A | 6 | |
| 1937–38 | Salisbury & District League Division Two A | 10 | |
| 1938–39 | Salisbury & District League Division Two A | 8 | |
| 1946–47 | Salisbury & District League Division 2 Junior | | |
| 1947–48 | Salisbury & District League | | |
| 1948–49 | Salisbury & District League | | |
| 1949–50 | Salisbury & District League Division Three B | | |
| 1950–51 | Salisbury & District League | | |
| 1951–52 | Salisbury & District League Division One | | |
| 1952–53 | Salisbury & District League | | |
| 1953–54 | Salisbury & District League Division Three B | 2 | Promoted |
| 1954–55 | Salisbury & District League Division Two | 1 | Champions, promoted |
| 1955–56 | Salisbury & District League Division One | 1 | Champions, promoted |
| 1956–57 | Wiltshire League Division One | 9/13 | |
| 1957–58 | Wiltshire League Division One | 12/16 | |
| 1957–58 | Wiltshire League Division One | 3/13 | |
| 1959–60 | | | |
| 1960–61 | | | |
| 1961–62 | | | |
| 1962–63 | | | |
| 1963–64 | | | |
| 1964–65 | | | |
| 1965–66 | | | |
| 1966–67 | | | |
| 1967–68 | | | |
| 1968–69 | | | |
| 1969–70 | | | |
| 1970–71 | | | |
| 1971–72 | | | |
| 1972–73 | Wiltshire League Division One | 16/16 | |
| 1973–74 | Wiltshire League Division One | 15/16 | |
| 1974–75 | Wiltshire League Division One | 1/15 | Champions |
| 1975–76 | Wiltshire League Division One | 2/17 | |
| 1976–77 | Wiltshire County League Senior Division One | 4/16 | |
| 1977–78 | Wiltshire County League Division One | 5/16 | |
| 1978–79 | Wiltshire County League Division One | 2/16 | |
| 1979–80 | Wiltshire County League Division One | 1/16 | Champions |
| 1980–81 | Wiltshire County League Division One | 4/16 | |
| 1981–82 | Wiltshire County League Division One | 4/17 | |
| 1982–83 | Wiltshire County League Division One | 5/16 | |
| 1983–84 | Wiltshire County League Division One | 3/16 | |
| 1984–85 | Wiltshire County League Division One | 12/16 | |
| 1985–86 | Wiltshire County League Division One | 13/14 | |
| 1986–87 | Wiltshire County League Division One | 8/15 | |
| 1987–88 | Wiltshire County League Division One | 3/16 | |
| 1988–89 | Wiltshire County League Division One | 4/14 | |
| 1989–90 | Wiltshire County League Division One | 2/15 | |
| 1990–91 | Wiltshire County League Division One | 1/13 | Champions |
| 1991–92 | Wiltshire County League Division One | 1/15 | Champions |
| 1992–93 | Wiltshire League Division One | 4/16 | |
| 1993–94 | Wiltshire League Division One | 2/15 | Promoted |
| 1994–95 | Western League Division One | 12/21 | |
| 1995–96 | Western League Division One | 16/19 | |
| 1996–97 | Western League Division One | 20/20 | Resigned |
| 1997–98 | Salisbury & District League Premier Division | 2 | Promoted |
| 1998–99 | Hampshire League Division Three | 4/18 | Promoted |
| 1999–00 | Hampshire League Premier Division | 1/22 | Champions |
| 2000–01 | Hampshire League Premier Division | 12/21 | |
| 2001–02 | Hampshire League Premier Division | 20/21 | |
| 2002–03 | Hampshire League Premier Division | 11/20 | |
| 2003–04 | Hampshire League Premier Division | 8/18 | |
| 2004–05 | Wessex League Division Two | 15/22 | |
| 2005–06 | Wessex League Division Two | 19/22 | Division Two renamed Division One |
| 2006–07 | Wessex League Division One | 18/19 | |
| 2007–08 | Wessex League Division One | 11/21 | |
| 2008–09 | Wessex League Division One | 12/21 | |
| 2009–10 | Wessex League Division One | 11/21 | |
| 2010–11 | Wessex League Division One | 13/19 | |
| 2011–12 | Wessex League Division One | 14/18 | |
| 2012–13 | Wessex League Division One | 14/16 | |
| 2013–14 | Wessex League Division One | 10/16 | |
| 2014–15 | Wessex League Division One | 4/15 | |
| 2015–16 | Wessex League Division One | 2/18 | Promoted |
| 2016–17 | Wessex League Premier Division | 19/22 | |
| 2016–17 | Wessex League Premier Division | 20/22 | Relegated |
| 2018–19 | Wessex League Division One | 2/19 | Promoted |
| 2019–20 | Wessex League Premier Division | – | Season abandoned due to COVID-19 pandemic |
| 2020–21 | Wessex League Premier Division | – | Season abandoned due to COVID-19 pandemic |
| 2021–22 | Wessex League Premier Division | 21/21 | Relegated |
| 2022–23 | Wessex League Division One | 19/20 | Relegated |
| 2023–24 | Wiltshire League Premier Division | 1/16 | Promoted |
| 2024–25 | Wessex League Division One | 9/20 | |
| 2025–26 | Wessex League Division One | 11/22 | |

== Honours ==
- Hampshire League
  - Premier Division champions 1999–2000
- Wiltshire County League
  - Division One champions 1979–80, 1990–91, 1991–92
- Wiltshire League
  - Champions 1974–75, 1979–80, 1990–91, 1991–92, 2023–24
- Wiltshire Senior Cup
  - Winners 1983–84, 1993–94

== Records ==
- Best FA Cup performance: Preliminary round, 2016–17
- Best FA Vase performance: Third round, 1979–80, 2025–26
- Record attendance: 625

== See also ==
- Amesbury Town F.C. players
