= Andover Town F.C. =

Association football club in England

Coordinates: 51°13′9.980″N 1°30′54.749″W

Andover Town
- Full name: Andover Town Football Club
- Nickname: Bluebirds
- Founded: 2013
- Ground: Portway Stadium, Andover
- Capacity: 3,000
- Owner: Proleague Limited
- Chairman: Mohammad Alkandari
- Manager: Robbie Skeates
- League: Hampshire Premier League Division One
- 2025–26: Hampshire Premier League Senior Division, 16th of 16 (relegated)
Home colours	Away colours

Andover Town Football Club is a football club based in Andover, Hampshire, England. They are currently members of the Hampshire Premier League Division One and play at the Portway Stadium.

== History ==
The club was established by staff from Andover College and Sparsholt College in 2013 after Andover FC had disbanded; the two colleges approached Test Valley Borough Council about taking over Andover's Portway Stadium to use for their football academy programmes, with the aim of also forming a senior club. The club were elected to Division One of the Wessex League. During their first season they were involved in a Hampshire Senior Cup tie at Brockenhurst which finished 0–0 after extra time; in the subsequent penalty shootout, 29 consecutive penalties were scored, with Brockenhurst eventually winning 15–14. This was later confirmed by the Football Association as an English record (and possibly a world record) for the highest number of consecutive goals scored in a penalty shootout.

At the end of the 2013–14 season Andover were Division One runners-up, earning promotion to the Premier Division. The following season saw them make their debut in the FA Vase, and in 2015–16 they played in the FA Cup for the first time. In 2017–18 the club were Premier Division runners-up, potentially earning promotion to Division One West of the Southern League. However, the club turned down promotion and were relegated to Division One of the Wessex League as punishment.

In 2023–24 Andover finished bottom of Division One and were relegated to the Senior Division of the Hampshire Premier League. They finished bottom of the Senior Division in 2025–26 and were relegated to Division One.

== Ground ==
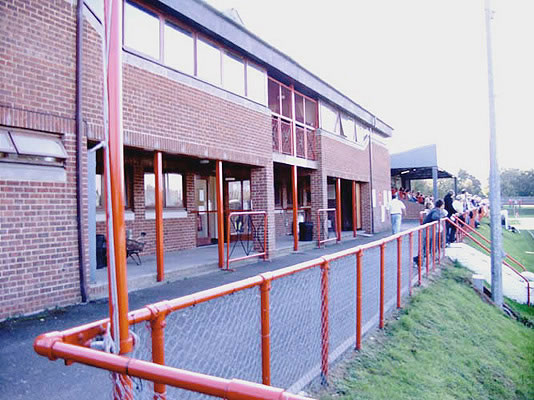
Photograph of the Portway Stadium, showing the clubhouse, stand and banking

The club took over Andover FC's Portway Stadium following a vote at Test Valley Borough Council in July 2013. The stadium had been built in 1989 at a cost of £850,000. A large stand with bench seating was built on one side of the pitch and slightly raise above it, with the other three sides left open. After being refurbished, the ground was reopened on 28 December 2013 for a match against Team Solent, with Andover winning 4–0 in front of a crowd of 161.

== Records ==
- Best FA Cup performance: First qualifying round, 2016–17
- Best FA Vase performance: Second round, 2016–17
- Record attendance: 546 vs Salisbury, Wessex League Premier Division, 18 August 2015
- Biggest win: 11–0 vs East Cowes Victoria Athletic, Wessex League Division One, 25 January 2014
- Heaviest defeat: 6–0 vs Salisbury, Wessex League Premier Division, 2 February 2016
- Most appearances: Alex Doctree, 130
- Most goals: Michael Dixon, 52

== See also ==
- Andover Town F.C. players
