= Pewsey Vale F.C. =

Association football club in England

Coordinates: 51°20′16.65″N 1°45′40.61″W

Pewsey Vale
- Full name: Pewsey Vale Football Club
- Nickname: The Vale
- Founded: 1948
- Ground: The Recreation Ground, Pewsey
- Chairman: Lee Jeffrey
- Manager: Christopher Waddilove
- League: Wiltshire League Premier Division
- 2025–26: Wiltshire League Premier Division, 7th of 17
Home colours	Away colours

Pewsey Vale F.C. is a football club based in the village of Pewsey, Wiltshire, England. They play in the Wiltshire Premier League.

== History ==
The club was formed in 1948, although there is evidence of earlier teams in Pewsey including a club named Pewsey Boys in 1921, and a club called Pewsey Y.M. which entered the FA Cup in 1939, 1945 and 1946.

Pewsey Vale FC won the Wiltshire FA Senior Cup in the 1990-01 and 1999–2000 seasons. Promoted to the Great Mills League as champions of the Adkey Wiltshire league, Pewsey were one of the first clubs to benefit from the pyramid system by joining the Screwfix League and then Hellenic League Division One West in 2001. The club immediately won promotion to the Premier League after finishing runners up to Hook Norton, before being relegated back to Division One West. After three seasons in the Premier Division, the club were relegated to Division One and after a further year of struggle, at the end of the 2008–9 season the club took the step to drop down to the Wiltshire League in order to rebuild under the stewardship of Adi Holcombe and Lewis Taylor.

The 2009/10 season resulted in the winning of the Wiltshire Premier League Cup. The next season Pewsey Vale successfully applied to join the Wessex League and in the 2010–11 season started playing in Wessex League Division One.

Since the 2000s the team has been eligible for the FA Vase, with their best performances being the three seasons in which they reached the first round proper.

== Ground ==
The club play their home games at the Recreation Ground, Kings Corner, Ball Road, Pewsey, SN9 5BS.

In 1950, the club took up the offer of a lease on part of the village's Recreation Ground but it was not until the early 1980s that a permanent clubhouse was built, unaided by grants and so mainly through the generosity of several local businesses.

The ground was substantially improved with the help of FA grants in the close season of 2002 to meet Hellenic Premier League standards. This included floodlighting, undercover seating for 50 people and hardstanding all round the perimeter of the playing area. The clubhouse was extensively repaired and refurbished in the early 2020s, with grant funding from The Football Foundation and many other bodies, sponsorship from local businesses and substantial voluntary work from club members.

Replacing the floodlights installed in 2000 became the club's priority in 2024.

== Notable former players ==
- Jon Guthrie (2001–2012): progressed through the youth system at Pewsey Vale before making first-team debut aged 16. Signed professionally at Crewe Alexandra in 2012 and has played for Walsall in League One and for Livingston in the Scottish Premiership. Joined Northampton Town on a two-year contract in June 2021 and became club captain in 2023.
- Murray Fishlock (2007): played in the Football League for Hereford United and Yeovil in Football Conference before finishing his career with Pewsey Vale in 2007. Murray also played for the England semi-professional representative team.

== Records ==
- Highest League Position: 18th in Hellenic Premier Division, 2003–04
- FA Vase: 1st Round (3): 2003–04, 2005–06, 2006–07

== Honours ==
Wiltshire League Division One

• Winners (2): 1989–90, 1992–93

Wiltshire Senior Cup

• Winners (2): 1990–91, 1999–00

Wiltshire League Cup

• Winners (1): 2009–10
