= Andover New Street F.C. =

Association football club in England

Coordinates: 51.2317°N 1.5009°W

Andover New Street
- Full name: Andover New Street Football Club
- Nickname: The Street
- Founded: 1890s
- Ground: Foxcotte Park, Charlton
- Chairman: Ade Burdock
- Manager: Jamie Coleman
- League: Wessex League Premier Division
- 2024–25: Wessex League Premier Division, 5th of 20
- Website: ansfc.co.uk
Home colours	Away colours

Andover New Street Football Club is a football club based in Andover, Hampshire, England. Affiliated to the Hampshire Football Association, they are currently members of the Wessex League Premier Division and play at Foxcotte Park in the neighbouring village of Charlton.

== History ==
The club was established in the 1890s as St Mary's Youth by the vicar of St Mary's Church, before being renamed St Mary's Swifts and then New Street in 1895. After disbanding during the 1950s, the club was reformed in 1961. They played in the Andover & District League, before moving up to the North Hants League. In 1976 the club joined Division Four of the Hampshire League, which they won at the first attempt, earning promotion to Division Three. The club went on to win Division Three the following season and were promoted to Division Two.

When the Wessex League was formed in 1986, several clubs left the Hampshire League and New Street were promoted to Division One. They finished bottom of Division One in 1989–90 and were relegated to Division Two. The following season saw the club relegated again as they finished second-from-bottom of Division Two. However, they were Division Three runners-up in 1991–92 to secure an immediate promotion back to Division Two. The club finished as runners-up in Division Two the following season and were promoted back to Division One.

Division One was renamed the Premier Division in 1999, and in 2001 the club was renamed Andover New Street. They were Premier Division runners-up in 2003–04 and also won the League Cup. However, it was the final season of the Hampshire League, as it merged into the Wessex League, with the club becoming members of the new Division Two, which was renamed Division One in 2006. They were Division One runners-up in 2017–18, earning promotion to the Premier Division, as well as winning the North Hants Senior Cup and the Andover Open Cup.

In 2018–19 Andover New Street competed in the FA Cup for the first time. Although their league season saw them finish bottom of the Premier Division, resulting in relegation back to Division One, they retained both the Andover Open Cup and North Hants Senior Cup. In 2021–22 the club were runners-up in Division One, qualifying for the promotion play-offs, in which they lost 3–0 to Laverstock & Ford in the semi-finals. The following season saw the club win the Division One title, earning promotion to the Premier Division. They finished fifth in the Premier Division in 2024–25, going on to beat AFC Stoneham on penalties in the play-off semi-finals before losing 2–1 to Fareham Town in the final.

== Ground ==
After being reformed in 1961, the club played at Walled Meadow, the ground of Andover. They later moved to London Road and the Drove before relocating to Foxcotte Park in 1992.

== Honours ==
- Wessex League
  - Division One champions 2022–23
- Hampshire League
  - Division Three champions 1977–78
  - Division Four champions 1976–77
  - League Cup winners 2003–04
- North Hants Senior Cup
  - Winners 2017–18, 2018–19
- Andover Open Cup
  - Winners 2017–18, 2018–19

== Records ==
- Best FA Cup performance: First qualifying round, 2024–25
- Best FA Vase performance: Semi-finals, 2024–25
- Record attendance: 1,390 vs AFC Whyteleafe, FA Vase semi-final, 5 April 2025
