= Fleet Spurs F.C. =

Association football club in England

Coordinates: 51°17′27.01″N 0°47′59.49″W

Fleet Spurs
- Full name: Fleet Spurs Football Club
- Nickname: Spurs
- Founded: 1951
- Ground: Kennels Lane, Southwood
- Capacity: 1,000 (250 Seated)
- Chairman: John Haddock
- Manager: John Haddock
- League: Thames Valley Premier League Division One
- 2025–26: Thames Valley Premier League Division One, 10th of 12
Home colours	Away colours

Fleet Spurs Football Club are a football club based in Fleet, England. They play in the Thames Valley Premier League Division One. The club is affiliated to the Hampshire Football Association and is an FA Charter Standard Development club.

== History ==
Fleet Spurs were established in 1948, originally playing friendlies. In 1951 the club then joined the Aldershot & District Football League, where they remained until the end of the 1964–65 season. For the 1965–66 season the club joined the Surrey Premier League and became League A champions in the 1968–69 season. The club, though, returned to the Aldershot & District League from the 1971–72 season.

They joined Division Three of the Hampshire League in 1991 after becoming dual Aldershot Senior League champions and Peter Benyon Cup winners the season before. In their first season in the Hampshire League they immediately gained promotion to Division Two. Six seasons later in the 1997–98 they gained further promotion as they climbed to Division One as Division Two champions. The club stayed in the top flight of the Hampshire League though for just two seasons as when the league was re-organised they were placed in the newly formed Division One, just below the Premier Division. The club then stayed in Division One until the end of the 2003–04 season, when the Wessex League merged with the Hampshire League and Fleet Spurs were placed in the newly formed Division Three of the Wessex league.

At the end of the 2006–07 season Division Three was renamed Division Two and the club was promoted to Division One as Division Two was disbanded. Since then the club has remained as a member of the Wessex League Division One.

In the 2010–11 season the club made its debut in its first FA national competition when they entered the FA Vase for the first time. A season later the club made their debut in the FA Cup being knocked out by fellow debutants Shrewton United.

In November 2013, they were obliged to change their badge, which included a stylised cockerel, because its similarity to Tottenham Hotspur's logo infringed that club's copyright. At the end of the 2020–21 season the club were transferred to Division One of the Wessex League.

At the start of the 2023-24 Season, once relegated from the Wessex League they entered the Hampshire Premier League Senior Division. After their first season in the Hampshire League, they transferred to the Thames Valley Premier League Division 1.

== Ground ==
Fleet Spurs play their games at Kennels Lane in Southwood, near Farnborough.

== Honours ==
=== League honours ===
- Hampshire League Division Two
  - Champions (1): 1997–89
- Surrey Premier League A Division
  - Champions (1): 1968–69
- Aldershot Senior League
  - Champions (1): 1990–91

=== Cup honours ===
- Surrey Premier League Cup
  - Runners-up (1): 1970–71
- Peter Benyon Cup:
  - Winners (1): 1990–91
- Hampshire Junior Cup B Winners:
  - Winners (1): 1952–53
- Aldershot Junior Cup Winners:
  - Winners (1): 1952–53

== Records ==
- Highest League Position: 3rd in Wessex League Division One 2009–10
- FA Cup best performance: Extra Preliminary Round 2011–12, 2012–13
- FA Vase best performance: Second Qualifying Round 2010–11,
