= United Services Portsmouth F.C. =

Association football club in England

Coordinates: 50°47′39″N 1°06′03″W

United Services Portsmouth
- Full name: United Services Portsmouth Football Club
- Nickname: The RN
- Founded: 1962 (as Portsmouth Royal Navy)
- Ground: The Victory Stadium, Portsmouth
- Chairman: Lt Cdr Richard Stephenson RN
- Manager: Chris Tait
- League: Hampshire Premier League Senior Division
- 2025–26: Wessex League Division One, 22nd of 22 (relegated)
- Website: USPortsmouthfc.co.uk
| Home colours | Away colours |

United Services Portsmouth F.C. is a football club based in Portsmouth, Hampshire, England. They were established in 1962 as Portsmouth Royal Navy and were among the founding members of the Wessex League in 1986. In 2004, they changed their name to their present one. They are currently members of the Hampshire Premier League Senior Division.

== History ==
Portsmouth Royal Navy FC was formed in 1962 by Dennis Probee with the intention of providing competitive football at the highest level possible to bridge the gap between the United Services mid week Leagues and the Royal Navy and Combined Services Representative Sides.

Portsmouth Royal Navy FC played in the Hampshire League from its formation until the 1985–86 season when the club became one of the seventeen founder members of the Wessex League. They stayed in the Wessex league until the 2001–02 season. This prompted changes in the infrastructure of Portsmouth Royal Navy FC and the change of name to United Services Portsmouth FC in 2004. The change of name also marked the opening up of the side to players from all of the armed services as well as civilians. The club remained in Division One until 2021, when they were promoted to the Premier Division based on their results in the abandoned 2019–20 and 2020–21 seasons.

== Ground ==
United Services Portsmouth play their home games at Victory Stadium, Burnaby Road, Portsmouth, PO1 2EJ.

The Victory Ground has gradually developed and now has a 500 seated covered stand, two floodlit Hockey Astroturf pitches (the main hockey pitch is named after Lt Cdr Alan Walker, the father of the Royal Navy Hockey Association), electronic scoreboard and a clubhouse. Changing facilities were constructed under the main stand during the 1995–96 season.

== Honours ==
- Hampshire League Division Two:
  - Winners: 1967–68, 1977–78 1980–81
- Russell Cotes Cup
  - Winners: 1967–68
- Portsmouth Senior Cup
  - Winners: 2011–12

== Records ==
- Highest League Position:
  - 17th in Wessex League Premier Division: 2021–22
- FA Cup Best Performance
  - Third Qualifying Round: 1997–98, 1998–99
- FA Vase Best Performance
  - Semi-finals: 2020–21
