= Fawley A.F.C. =

Association football club in England

Coordinates: 50°50′05″N 1°23′19″W

Fawley
- Full name: Fawley Association Football Club
- Nickname: The Oilers
- Founded: 1923
- Ground: Waterside Sports & Social Club, Holbury
- Chairman: Kevin Mitchell
- Manager: Lee Shepherd and Simon Eagle
- League: Wessex League Division One
- 2025–26: Wessex League Division One, 19th of 22
- Website: fawleyafc.com
Home colours	Away colours

Fawley Association Football Club is a football club based in Fawley, near Southampton, in Hampshire, England. They are currently members of Wessex League Division One and play at the Waterside Sports & Social Club in Holbury.

== History ==
The club was established in 1923 under the name AGWI United, taking their name from the Atlantic, Gulf and West Indies Oil Company that owned the Fawley Refinery, opened two years previously. They joined Division Two of the Hampshire League in 1929 and finished bottom of the division in their first season in the league. The club remained in Division Two until World War II. Following the war the club became members of Division Three (West) in 1948 and finished bottom of the division in 1948–49. They were then renamed Esso (Fawley), reflecting the purchase of the refinery by Esso.

Esso (Fawley) finished bottom of Division Three (West) again in 1951–52. Although the following season saw the club win the division, earning promotion to Division Two, they finished bottom of Division Two in 1953–54 and were relegated to Division Three (East). They finished bottom of Division Three (East) the following season. In 1955 league reorganisation saw the two regional third divisions merged, but after finishing second-from-bottom of the new Division Three in 1955–56, the club left the league. They returned to the league in 1960, rejoining Division Three. They finished bottom of the division in 1967–68, after which Division Three was split into East and West sections again, with the club placed in Division Three West; they went on to finish bottom of the division for the next two seasons, after which the club left the league again.

After playing in the Southampton Saturday League, Esso (Fawley) rejoined Division Three of the Hampshire League in 1992. They were Division Three champions in 1994–95, earning promotion to Division Two. A fifth-place finish in Division Two in 1998–99 saw the club promotion to Division One, which was renamed the Premier Division for the following season. In 2002 the club adopted their current name. In 2004 the Hampshire League merged into the Wessex League, with Fawley becoming members of the new Division Two (renamed Division One in 2006). In 2009–10 the club were Division One runners-up and were promoted to the Premier Division. They were relegated back to Division One at the end of the 2016–17 season after finishing in the bottom three of the Premier Division.

== Honors ==
- Hampshire League
  - Division Three champions 1994–95
  - Division Three (West) champions 1952–53

== Records ==
- Best FA Cup performance: Extra-preliminary round, 2012–13, 2013–14, 2014–15, 2015–16, 2016–17, 2017–18
- Best FA Vase performance: Second round, 2011–12
