= Solent University F.C. =

Association football club in England

Coordinates: 50°55′49.516″N 1°28′3.529″W

Team Solent F.C.
- Full name: Team Solent Football Club
- Nickname: The Sparks
- Founded: 2005; 21 years ago
- Dissolved: 2020; 6 years ago
- Ground: Test Park Sports Ground; Southampton
- Capacity: 1,500
Home colours	Away colours

Team Solent F.C. was a football club attached to Solent University, based in Southampton, Hampshire. They were affiliated to the Hampshire Football Association, as a FA Charter Standard club and from 2011-20 were members of the Wessex League.

== History ==
Team Solent were formed in 2005 as the competitive sporting arm of Southampton Solent University.

A side was entered in the Southampton League and enjoyed immediate success winning trophies galore, before becoming a founder member of the Hampshire Premier League in 2007. They were winners of the inaugural League Cup in 2008 and won their first Southampton Senior Cup in 2009. Further successes followed, and after moving to a redeveloped Test Park, they won promotion to the Wessex League Division One in 2011. The next few seasons, saw Team Solent narrowly miss out on promotion before going up in 2015 as champions. They quickly adjusted to life in the Premier Division and in 2016 won the Southampton Senior Cup for the fourth time and also the Wessex League Cup. In 2017 Team Solent enjoyed an extended run in the national FA Vase, reaching Round 5 before going down 2-5 at home against eventual winners South Shields.

In 2019, the club was renamed Solent University FC but on 10th June 2020, they were suddenly withdrew with the University citing the "changing landscape of Higher Education which has caused a realignment of the priorities and the desire to support other sporting ambitions" as the reason for this decision.

Solent University continue to run student sides in the national BUCS (British University & Colleges Sports) competitions.

== Honours ==
- Wessex League
  - Division 1 Champions 2014/15
  - League Cup Winners 2015/16
- Hampshire Premier League
  - Senior Division Runners-up 2009/10 and 2010/11
  - League Cup Winners 2007/08 and 2010/11
- Hampshire Football Association
  - Junior 'A' Cup Winners 2005/06
- Southampton Football Association
  - Senior Cup Winners 2008/09, 2010/11, 2014/15 and 2015/16
  - Senior Cup Finalists 2009/10 and 2016/17
  - Junior 'A' Cup Winners 2005/06
- Southampton League
  - Senior Division 1 Champions 2006/07
  - Junior Division 1 Champions 2005/06

== League record 2005-20 ==
Season	Division	Position	Significant events
2005-07	Southampton League	-	
2007/08	Hampshire Premier League	8/17	Founder Members + League Cup winners
2008/09	Hampshire Premier League	3/18	Southampton Senior Cup winners
2009/10	Hampshire Premier League	2/18	Southampton Senior Cup finalists
2010/11	Hampshire Premier League	2/18	Promoted. Southampton Senior Cup & League Cup winners
2011/12	Wessex League Division 1	3/18	
2012/13	Wessex League Division 1	3/18	
2013/14	Wessex League Division 1	6/17	
2014/15	Wessex League Division 1	1/15	Promoted. Southampton Senior Cup winners
2015/16	Wessex League Premier Division	7/21	Southampton Senior Cup & League Cup winners
2016/17	Wessex League Premier Division	7/22	Reached Round 5 of FA Vase & Southampton Senior Cup finalists
2017/18	Wessex League Premier Division	17/22	
2018/19	Wessex League Premier Division	11/20	
2019/20	Wessex League Premier Division	0/20	Season abandoned due to COVID-19 pandemic. Left competition

== Ground ==
The club's home ground was Test Park Sports Ground, Lower Brownhill Road, Southampton SO16 9QZ. The record attendance was in 2017 when over 800 attended the FA Vase 5th round tie against South Shields.

The venue has several pitches (including an artificial one) and remains very much in use today. In 2021 Wessex League football returned when neighbours Millbrook took up residence.

== Notable players ==
Team Solent had some fine players during their short history, including some former academy players from various professional clubs - such as Jesse Waller-Lassen from Tottenham Hotspur. During their Wessex League days their player-manager was James Taylor, a vastly experienced semi-professional.

== Local rivalries ==
Team Solent had a number of rivals during various stages of their existence as they made rapid progress up through the local pyramid system. These included neighbours Bush Hill and QK Southampton whilst in the Hampshire Premier League, then Totton & Eling and Romsey Town - their closest rivals in the Wessex League.
