= Laverstock & Ford F.C. =

Association football club in England

Coordinates: 51.0794°N 1.7744°W

Laverstock & Ford
- Full name: Laverstock & Ford Football Club
- Nicknames: Lavvy, The Bulldogs
- Founded: 1956
- Ground: Church Road, Laverstock
- Chairman: John Pike
- Manager: Liam McConnell
- League: Wessex League Premier Division
- 2025–26: Wessex League Premier Division, 5th of 20
Home colours

Laverstock & Ford Football Club is a football club based in Laverstock, near Salisbury, Wiltshire, England. They are currently members of the Wessex League Premier Division and play at Church Road.

== History ==
The club was established in 1956 and joined Division Three B of the Salisbury & District League. They were runners-up in the division in their first season, earning promotion to Division Two. Although the club were relegated at the end of the 1960–61 season, they were promoted back to Division Two at the first attempt. The club were Division Two runners-up in 1962–63, securing a second consecutive promotion as they moved up to Division One. The following season saw them finish as runners-up in Division One. The club won the league title in 1970–71 and were runners-up the following season, also winning the Morrison Cup.

Two seasons after winning Division One, Laverstock & Ford were relegated to Division Two at the end of the 1972–73 season. They won the Wiltshire Junior Cup in 1973–74, and were promoted back to Division One in 1981–82, before moving up to the Premier Division in 1984. After winning the Stonehenge Cup and finishing as league runners-up in 1984–85, the club moved up to Division Two of the Wiltshire League. In 1986–87 the club were promoted to Division One, but they finished bottom of Division One in 1988–89 and were relegated back to Division Two.

In 1991 Laverstock & Ford left the Wiltshire League and returned to the Salisbury & District League. They joined Division Three of the Hampshire League in 1992, but left after a single season to return to the Salisbury & District League. In 1996 the club rejoined Division Three of the Hampshire League. League reorganisation in 1999 saw them placed in Division Two, and the club went on to win the Wiltshire Junior Cup again in 1999–2000. They won Division Two in 2002–03, earning promotion to Division One. In 2004 the Hampshire League merged into the Wessex League, with the club becoming members of the new Division Three.

Laverstock & Ford were Division Three runners-up in 2005–06 and were promoted to Division Two, which was renamed Division One the following season. They went on to finish as runners-up in Division One in 2007–08, earning promotion to the Premier Division. The club finished bottom of the Premier Division in 2011–12 and were relegated back to Division One. In 2021–22 they finished fifth in Division One, qualifying for the promotion play-offs. After defeating Andover New Street 3–0 in the semi-finals, the club beat Newport (IOW) 3–2 (after extra time) in the final and were promoted to the Premier Division.

The 2025–26 season saw Laverstock & Ford finish fifth in the Premier Division, going on to beat Hamble Club on penalties in the play-off semi-finals before losing on penalties to Portland United in the final. The season also saw them win the Wiltshire Premier Shield, defeating Westbury United 1–0 in the final.

== Ground ==
The club play at Church Road. Floodlights were installed during the 2005–06 season and a new 114-seat stand was installed in 2007–08.

== Honours ==
- Hampshire League
  - Division Two champions 2002–03
- Salisbury & District League
  - Division One champions 1970–71
  - Morrison Cup winners 1971–72
  - Stonehenge Cup winners 1984–85
- Wiltshire Premier Shield
  - Winners 2025–26
- Wiltshire Junior Cup
  - Winners 1973–74, 1999–2000

== Records ==
- Best FA Cup performance: Second qualifying round, 2022–23, 2025–26
- Best FA Vase performance: First round, 2009–10, 2010–11, 2013–14, 2015–16
