= Tadley Calleva F.C. =

Association football club in England

Coordinates: 51°21′29″N 1°08′09″W

Tadley Calleva
- Full name: Tadley Calleva Football Club
- Nickname: The Romans
- Founded: 1989 (Reformed as Tadley FC)
- Ground: Barlows Park, Tadley
- Capacity: 1,000
- Chairman: Sandy Russell
- Manager: Joe Lawler
- League: Combined Counties League Premier Division South
- 2025–26: Combined Counties League Premier Division South, 2nd of 20
Home colours	Away colours

Tadley Calleva Football Club are a football club based in Tadley, Hampshire/Berkshire, England. The club is affiliated to the Hampshire Football Association. The club's name of Calleva comes from the nearby Roman Town of Calleva Atrebatum, based just outside Silchester. They play in the Combined Counties League Premier Division South.

== History ==
The club was formed as Tadley F.C. in 1989. They joined the Hampshire League Division Three in 1994, finishing runners-up in 1995–96, gaining promotion to Division Two. The club changed its name to Tadley Town F.C. in 1999 and joined Division One upon reorganisation. In 2004, they changed to their present name and entered the Wessex Football League Division Three. Division Three was renamed Division Two in 2006, and the club finished runners-up in 2007. In the 2007–08, they won the Wessex League Division One title but were denied promotion as their ground did not meet the requirements for the Premier Division. Since then the team has remained in Division One.

Tadley has had a football team since the early 1900s. In the modern era the team was re-formed in 1989 and played in the Basingstoke and North Hants Leagues before winning promotion to the Hampshire League. The club was formed as Tadley F.C. in 1989. They joined the Hampshire League Division Three in 1994, finishing runners-up in 1995–96, gaining promotion to Division Two. The club changed its name to Tadley Town F.C. in 1999 and joined Division One upon re-organisation. In 2004, they changed their name to their present name and entered the Wessex Football League Division Three.

Division Three was renamed Division Two in 2006, and the club finished runners-up in 2007. In the 2007–08 season, they won the Wessex League Division One title but were denied promotion as their ground did not meet the requirements for the Premier Division.

Since then the team has remained in Division One. They narrowly missed out on promotion in 2014–15 and 2015–16 respectively by finishing in 3rd position in both seasons.

In the 2010–11 campaign they reached the final of the Basingstoke Senior Cup losing to Thatcham Town 4–1. The club then went on to win the Senior Cup in 2013–14 defeating local rivals AFC Aldermaston 3–2 (aet) in the final. In September 2014, the club defeated Basingstoke Town on penalties in the Hampshire FA Senior Cup at The Camrose after a 2–2 draw in 90 minutes.

The club had its best run in the FA Vase in the 2015–16 season, reaching the 3rd round proper before eventually being knocked out 4–2 after a replay and extra-time against Newport (IoW) from the Wessex Premier Division.

They have also reached the final of the North Hants Senior Cup in the last two seasons: losing out 3–1 to local rivals Whitchurch United in 2016–17, again at The Camrose, and then 5–4 on penalties to Andover New Street in 2017–18 at Longmeadow after a 3–3 draw in normal time.

The club achieved its ambition of gaining promotion to the Wessex League Premier Division in 2018–19 season – the highest level (Step 5) that the club had competed at. The goal is to consolidate its position on the field and to make significant progress with the infrastructure off the field. Tadley finished 8th in their first season.

Tadley were lying 13th after 28 games in season in 2019–20. The season finished in March due to the COVID-19 pandemic.

In 2020–21 Tadley had their best run in the FA Cup in the club's history, with team manager Adam Clarke guiding the club to reach the First qualifying round.

Tadley Calleva saw a change in league and management in the 2021–22 season. Tadley joined the Combined Counties League North. This was due to the FA restructuring at Steps 4–6. Adam Clarke stepped down due to work commitments. Joe Lawler and Ben Dillon were named as joint first team managers for the coming season. In the 2021–22 season the club finished 12th. In the 2022–23 season they moved to the Combined Counties League South.

They defeated Weymouth F.C. 4–2 in the 2025–26 FA Cup First qualifying round. In their first ever Second qualifying round match, they lost 2–0 against Bracknell Town F.C. the following season in fa cup they reach fourth qualifying round of fa cup to reach this stage for first time losing to Aldershot.

== Current squad ==
As of 8 September 2026

Note: Flags indicate national team as defined under FIFA eligibility rules; some limited exceptions apply. Players may hold more than one non-FIFA nationality.

No.	Pos.	Nation	Player
1	GK	IRL	Donnie Burke
2	DF	ENG	Nathan Smart
3	DF	ENG	Jordan Goater
—	DF	ENG	Joe Cummuskey
4	DF	ENG	Brad Neal
5	DF	ENG	Brad Passfield
6	MF	ENG	Scott Costello
7	MF	ENG	Alex Miller
8	MF	ENG	Jack French
9	FW	ENG	Kieran Rodgers
10	FW	ENG	Connor Thorne
11	FW	ENG	Alfie Burton
12	FW	ENG	Logan Lowes
—	GK	ENG	Craig Atkinson
14	FW	ENG	Tommy Nelson
15	MF	ENG	Lamin Sankoh
16	DF	ENG	Andrew Charsley
17	MF	ENG	Josh Ewing
18	FW	ENG	Lors Nicholas
19	FW	ENG	Charlie Barlow
20	MF	ENG	Mal Thomas

== Ground ==
Tadley Calleva play their home games at Barlows Park, Silchester Road, Tadley. The town of Tadley is in Hampshire but the ground is situated in neighbouring Berkshire.

Barlows Park was built on an old landfill site and was opened in 2007. The ground has pitch fencing, hard standing and flood lights. It is managed by the Barlow's Park Management Association and had once been home to Reading F.C. Women.

== Honours ==
=== League honours ===
- Wessex League Division One
  - Champions 2007–08
- Wessex League Division Two
  - Runners-up 2006–07
- Hampshire League Division Three
  - Runners-up 1995–96

=== Cup honours ===
- FA Cup 4th Qualifying Round 2026/27
- Basingstoke Senior Cup:
  - Winners (1): 2013–14
  - Runners up (1): 2010–11

== Records ==
- Highest league position: 2nd in Combined Counties League Premier Division South, 2025–26
- FA Cup best performance: Fourth qualifying round, 2026–27
- FA Vase best performance: Third round, 2015–16, 2024–25
- Record attendance: 1000 vs Aldershot Town, FA Cup fourth qualifying round replay, 20 October 2026
- Record victory: 14–0 v Farnborough, Hampshire Senior Cup round two, 10 September 2024
- Record goalscorer: Brett Denham
