= Hythe & Dibden F.C. =

Association football club in England

Coordinates: 50°52′03.9″N 1°25′11.8″W

Hythe & Dibden
- Full name: Hythe & Dibden Football Club
- Founded: 1902
- Ground: Clayfields, Hythe
- Manager: Richard Morse
- League: Wessex League Premier Division
- 2024–25: Wessex League Premier Division, 14th of 20
Home colours	Away colours

Hythe & Dibden Football Club is a football club based in Hythe, near Southampton in Hampshire. They are currently members of the Wessex League Premier Division and play at Clayfields.

== History ==
The club was established in 1902. In 1947, then known as Hythe and Power United, they joined Division Three West of the Hampshire League. The club won the division in 1949–50, but were relegated back to Division Three West at the end of the 1951–52 season after finishing bottom of Division Two. They were transferred to Division Three East in 1954, and the two third divisions were merged into one in 1955. The club finished bottom of Division Three in 1957–58 and 1959–60. After finishing bottom of Division Three for a third time in 1961–62, the club dropped into the junior leagues in Southampton.

Hythe & Dibden won Division Two of the Southampton League in 1970–71. The following season they finished second in Division One and were promoted to the Premier Division. However, two relegations saw the club back in Division Two by 1975. They won the title in 1975–76, but then yo-yoed between Division One and Division Two for several seasons. The club were promoted to the Premier Division in 1986, and returned to the Hampshire League in 1994 when they joined Division Three. After finishing as Division Three runners-up in their first season, the club were promoted to Division Two. In 1999 the league was reorganised and the club were placed in the Premier Division.

In 2004 the Hampshire League merged into the Wessex League, with Hythe & Dibden placed in the new Division Two. Two seasons later it was renamed Division One. In 2021 the club were promoted to the Premier Division based on their results in the abandoned 2019–20 and 2020–21 seasons.

== Ground ==
The club played at the Ewart Recreation Ground on Jones Lane, which was shared with a cricket club, before moving to a new ground at Clayfields in 2014.

== Honours ==
- Hampshire League
  - Division Three West champions 1949–50
- Southampton League
  - Division Two champions 1970–71, 1975–76

== Records ==
- Best FA Cup performance: First qualifying round, 2019–20, 2025–26
- Best FA Vase performance: Fourth round, 2025–26

== See also ==
- Hythe & Dibden F.C. players
