= Verwood Town F.C. =

Association football club in England

Coordinates: 50°51′56″N 1°51′46″W

Verwood Town
- Full name: Verwood Town Football Club
- Nickname: The Potters
- Founded: 1905
- Ground: Potterne Park; Verwood
- Capacity: 3000
- Chairman: Martin Gilham
- Manager: Darren Colarelli and Ricky Barton
- League: Dorset Premier League
- 2024–25: Wessex League Division One, 20th of 20 (relegated)
Home colours	Away colours

Verwood Town Football Club are a football club based in Verwood, Dorset, England. The club is affiliated to the Dorset County Football Association and is a FA chartered Standard club. They play in the Dorset Premier League.The clubs current management team is Darren Colarelli and Ricky Barton ( Management team)

== History ==
The club was founded in 1905 and played in the Bournemouth League for many years. In 1989 they entered the Hampshire League, and were runners-up in Division One in 2002–03. They were among the founding members of Wessex League Division Three in 2004. They were placed in Division one upon reorganisation and won the league in 2011–12 gaining promotion to the Wessex League Premier Division.

== Ground ==
Verwood Town play their home games at Potterne Park, Potterne Way, Verwood, BH21 6RS.

The club have covered seating and a covered terrace plus a refreshment bar.

== Honours ==
- Wessex League Division One
  - Champions 2011–12
- Hampshire League Division One
  - Runners-up 2002–03

== Records ==
- FA Cup
  - Extra Preliminary Round 2010–11, 2011–12, 2012–13
- FA Vase
  - Third Round 2010–11
