= Ringwood Town F.C. =

Association football club in England

Coordinates: 50°49′56″N 1°46′38″W

Ringwood Town
- Full name: Ringwood Town Football Club
- Founded: 1879
- Ground: Macra Community Stadium Long Lane, Ringwood
- Capacity: 1,000
- Chairman: Phil King
- Manager: Francois Mathers
- League: Wessex League Division One
- 2025–26: Wessex League Division One, 10th of 22
Home colours	Away colours

Ringwood Town F.C. is a football club based in Ringwood, Hampshire, England. The club is affiliated to the Hampshire Football Association, and is a FA Charter Standard Community Club. They are members of the Wessex League Division One.

== History ==
The Ringwood Almanac says that the Ringwood Town Football Club was formed in 1879. The club is first mentioned in county records in 1886 when it used the title of Ringwood Hornets.

The team was disbanded during the 1914–1918 war and was re-established in 1918 as Ringwood Comrades, consisting mainly of servicemen returning from the battlefields.

In 1936, the club reverted to the name of Ringwood Town Football Club but was disbanded again during the Second World War. In 1946 the club was listed as Ringwood & Welworthy Football Club but soon reverted to the title of Ringwood Town and has played under that name ever since.

The club played at Carvers Playing Fields during the 1950s and 1960s but an ambitious club committee, encouraged by Ringwood Town Council, laid the foundations for the club to move to the present Long Lane ground.

Successive committees have continued to improve the facilities at the ground such that the club was able to join the Wessex League in 2004.

Picture of Ringwood Town in action

Ringwood Town have won the Bournemouth Senior Cup on four occasions and runner up on a further four. In 1980 the club recorded its most memorable achievement when Southern League opponents were defeated to win the Russell Cotes Cup. Since then the club was promoted to Hampshire League Division One only to be relegated the following season. The club has had success in the Bournemouth Leagues and in the Bournemouth F.A. Page Croft Cup.

During 2003–04 season the first team reached the final of the Hampshire League Floodlit Cup whilst the reserve team won the Hampshire League Combination 2 Division, skippered by Craig Seymour. The following season saw them make their debut in national competition, entering the FA Vase for the first time.

In the 2014–2015 season, Ringwood Reserves endured a successful season by winning the Wyvern West League with 3 games to spare. The reserves later folded before the 2015–2016 season.

At the end of the 2015–2016 season, the Wyvern winning side got back together to participate in the St Mary's Stadium football tournament. After a round Robin where the team finished on the top spot with 4 goals scored and 0 conceded, they progressed to the semi-finals which they won on penalties after a winning penalty from James Crouch and later won the tournament with a 1–0 win with Matt Nabney's goal.

== Ground ==
Ringwood Town play their home games at the Ringwood Community Hub, Long Lane, Ringwood, Hampshire, sharing the facility with AFC Bournemouth's Community Sports Trust.

== Honours ==
- Wessex League Division Two
  - Promoted: 2005–06
- Hampshire League Division Two
  - Promoted: 1985–86
- Hampshire League Division Three
  - Champions: 1995–96
  - Promoted: 1976–77
- Wyvern Combination West Div 1
  - Champions: 2013–14
- Bournemouth Senior Cup
  - Champions: Four times
- Russell-Cotes Cup
  - Champions: 1980
- St Mary's Stadium Tournament
  - Champions: 2016

== Records ==
- FA Cup
  - First Qualifying Round 2010–11
- FA Vase
  - Second Qualifying Round 2004–05, 2005–06, 2006–07, 2009–10, 2011–12
