= Whitchurch United F.C. =

Coordinates: 51°13′25″N 1°20′08″W

Whitchurch United
- Full name: Whitchurch United Football Club
- Nickname: The Jam Boys
- Founded: 1903
- Ground: Longmeadow, Whitchurch
- Capacity: 1,500
- Chairman: Max Butler
- Manager: TBC
- League: Wessex League Division One
- 2025–26: Wessex League Division One, 5th of 22
Home colours	Away colours

Whitchurch United F.C. is an English football club based in Whitchurch, Hampshire. The club has senior teams in the Wessex League Division One and play at Longmeadow Sports Centre. The club has a youth section with teams for all ages and genders from Under 7 to Under 18 which play in the North East Hampshire, Testway League and Peter Houseman Youth Leagues. The club also has a Women's and Girls Section with girls teams in the Hampshire Girls Youth League at U8, U9, U10, U12, U14, U15, U16, U18 as well as women's recreational football.

== History ==
The club was established in 1903 by a merger of Whitchurch Rovers and Whitchurch Albion. They joined the Hampshire League in 1958, and in 1989–90 they won Division Two and were promoted to Division One. In 1991–92 they finished third and moved up to the Wessex League. After finishing bottom of the league in 1993–94 they were relegated back to the Hampshire League. However, they finished as runners-up in their first season back in the Hampshire League Premier Division, and were promoted back to the Wessex League.

They finished bottom of the league in 2002–03 but avoided relegation. After finishing bottom again the following season they were relegated to the league's newly formed Division Two.

The 2012–13 season saw the club finish as runners-up in Division 1 of the Sydenhams (Wessex) League, behind leaders Brockenhurst (only by goal difference) and gain promotion to the Premier Division.

== Ground ==
Whitchurch United play their home games at Longmeadow Sports Centre, Winchester Street, Whitchurch, Hampshire, RG28 7RB.

== Honours ==
=== League honours ===
- Wessex League Division One
  - Runners Up (1): 2012–13
- Hampshire League Division Two
  - Champions (1): 1989–90

=== Cup honours ===
- North Hants Senior Cup:
  - Runners up (1): 2012–13
- Andover League Open Cup
  - Runners Up (1): 2012–13

== Records ==
- Best FA Cup performance: Second qualifying round, 2011–12
- Best FA Vase performance: First Round Proper, 2004–05, 2025–26
