= East Cowes Victoria A.F.C. =

Association football club in England

Coordinates: 50.7447°N 1.2770°W

East Cowes Victoria Athletic
- Full name: East Cowes Victoria Athletic Football Club
- Nickname: The Vics
- Founded: 1885
- Ground: Beatrice Avenue, East Cowes
- Capacity: 2000 (200) seated
- Chairman: Mark Greenslade
- Manager: Alex Smith
- League: Wessex League Premier Division
- 2024–25: Wessex League Division One, 4th of 20 (promoted via play-offs)
Home colours

East Cowes Victoria Athletic Football Club is a football club based in East Cowes, Isle of Wight, England They are currently members of the Wessex League Premier Division and play at Beatrice Avenue.

== History ==
The club was established in 1885, taking the Victoria part of the name as their Beatrice Avenue ground is in an area owned by Osborne House, one of the homes of Queen Victoria. They were founder members of the Isle of Wight League in 1898, and won the league in its inaugural season. They retained the league title the following season and went on to win the league again in 1930–31, 1934–35 and 1935–36.

In 1947 East Cowes moved up to the Hampshire League. They were Division Two runners-up in 1948–49 and again the following season. After finishing as runners-up for a third time in 1951–52, the club won the division in 1952–53, earning promotion to Division One. However, they were relegated back to Division Two at the end of the 1954–55 season. In 1960–61 the club finished bottom of Division Two and were relegated to Division Three. They were Division Three champions in 1963–64 and were promoted back to Division Two.

East Cowes finished bottom of Division Two in 1966–67, resulting in relegation to Division Three. When Division Three was split into regional divisions in 1968, the club were placed in Division Three West. The two divisions were merged in 1971 to create Division Three and Division Four, with East Cowes placed in Division Three. They went on to win the division, earning promotion to Division Two. In 1977–78 they finished third in Division Two and were promoted to Division One. Although the club were relegated after finishing bottom of Division One in 1981–82, they won Division Two the following season and were promoted back to Division One.

The 1985–86 season saw East Cowes win the Division One title for the first time. After retaining the title the following season, the club moved up to the Wessex League. The club won the Wessex League Cup in their first season in the league. They finished bottom of the league in 1999–2000 they finished bottom of the Wessex League and were relegated back to the Hampshire League, becoming members of its Premier Division. They were runners-up in 2001–02, and in 2004 the Hampshire League merged into the Wessex League, with East Cowes becoming members of Division Two. The division was renamed Division One in 2006.

== Honours ==
- Wessex League
  - League Cup winners 1987–88
- Hampshire League
  - Division One champions 1985–86, 1986–87
  - Division Two champions 1952–53, 1982–83
  - Division Three champions 1963–64, 1971–72
- Isle of Wight League
  - Division One 1898–99, 1899–1900, 1930–31, 1934–35, 1935–36
- Isle of Wight Senior Gold Cup
  - Winners 1961–62, 1979–80, 1981–82, 1982–83, 1983–84, 1984–85, 1985–86, 1988–89
- Isle of Wight Challenge Cup
  - Winners 1899–1900, 1900–01, 1901–02, 1919–20, 1947–48, 1948–49, 1950–51, 1951–52, 1952–53, 1984–85, 1987–88, 1990–91, 1991–92
- Isle of Wight Memorial Cup
  - Winners 1919–20, 1932–33, 1982–83, 1987–88, 1990–91, 2009–10
- Isle of Wight Charity Cup
  - Winners 1923–24, 1925–26
- Isle of Wight Jubilee Cup
  - Winners 1949–50

== Records ==
- Best FA Cup performance: Second qualifying round, 1945–46, 1948–89
- Best FA Vase performance: Second round, 1975–76, 1988–89, 2024–25

== See also ==
- East Cowes Victoria Athletic A.F.C. players
