= David Peach =

English footballer (born 1951)

Personal information
- Full name: David Sidney Peach
- Date of birth: 21 January 1951 (age 75)
- Place of birth: Bedford, England
- Height: 5 ft 8 in (1.73 m)
- Position: Full-back

Youth career
- 1966–1969: Gillingham

Senior career*
| Years | Team | Apps | (Gls) |
| 1969–1974 | Gillingham | 187 | (30) |
| 1974–1980 | Southampton | 224 | (34) |
| 1980–1982 | Swindon Town | 53 | (2) |
| 1982–1983 | Leyton Orient | 47 | (6) |
| Total | | 511 | (72) |

International career
| 1977–1978 | England U21 | 8 | (1) |
| 1979 | England B | 1 | (0) |

Managerial career
- Wellworthy Athletic
- Lymington Town
- * Club domestic league appearances and goals

David Sidney Peach (born 21 January 1951) is an English former professional footballer who played as a full-back. He appeared for Southampton in the FA Cup final in 1976.

In 1969, he turned professional at Gillingham. Peach spent five years at the club, before moving to Southampton in 1974. During his time at Southampton, he won the FA Cup. He left to join Swindon Town in 1980 before joining Leyton Orient for a season in 1982.

== Club career ==
=== Gillingham ===
Peach played briefly as an associate schoolboy for Chelsea, before moving to Gillingham as an apprentice in May 1966, turning pro in February 1969. In 1972, he was sent off in successive seasons in matches at Hartlepool United, a coincidence in an era when sendings-off were still very uncommon. Peach was named in the 1973–74 Fourth Division PFA Team of the Year. He was rated the best player in the Fourth Division and came to the attention of Lawrie McMenemy who made him his first signing for Southampton in January 1974, for a reported fee of £50,000.

=== Southampton ===
He made his debut in a match that is memorable to Saints fans for all the wrong reasons as Southampton lost 7–0 away to Ipswich. Peach soon settled into the team initially in midfield before becoming an attacking left-back and the club's regular penalty taker. His first penalty was probably the most famous, as he scored the second goal against Crystal Palace in the FA Cup semi-final on 3 April 1976. Peach played in the final against Manchester United as Southampton won 1–0. He was named in the 1976–77 Second Division PFA Team of the Year.

Peach also played in the 1979 League Cup final, scoring the opening goal in a 3–2 loss to Nottingham Forest. He and Nick Holmes are the only two players to have played in two cup finals for Southampton.

On 18 August 1979, he became the highest scoring full-back in the history of the Football League when he scored a penalty against Manchester United.

=== Swindon and Leyton Orient ===
He was transferred to Swindon Town for £150,000 (then Swindon's record signing) in March 1980. Signed by Bobby Smith to replace Town legend John Trollope, circumstances were against Peach from the very moment he joined the club; his time at Swindon had the worst possible start – his debut coming in 6–2 defeat at Millwall. That defeat, along with the size of the transfer fee, got Peach off to a terrible start with the fans – and he was never a popular player throughout his whole Town career.

By March 1982, Swindon were in financial difficulties and Peach was released to Leyton Orient on a free transfer to reduce the club's wage bill, after a disappointing period at the County Ground.

In moving to Orient, he swapped a team heading for relegation to Division 4 for one heading for relegation from Division 2. While at Orient, he became the first player to have played on every Football League ground.

== International career ==
He played several times for the England under-21 and 'B' teams. All eight of his under-21 caps were as an "overage player" whereby he was at least 26 in all those appearances Peach was in the England squad on their tour of South America in June 1977, although he never played.

== After football ==
After retiring from league football, Peach turned out for several Hampshire non-league clubs, including a spell as player-manager at Wellworthy Athletic in Lymington and Lymington Town. Initially "attached" to a fish business in Lymington that failed, Peach started working as a labourer whilst acquiring skills necessary to move into site-management. Peach became assistant site-manager for A&B Homes in Southampton and later a site-manager with Miller Homes. He has worked as a contracts manager for Hazely Developments in Winchester whilst continuing to live in Milford-on-Sea.

== Honours ==
=== As a player ===
Southampton

- FA Cup: 1975–76
- Football League Cup runner-up: 1978–79

Individual

- PFA Team of the Year: 1973–74 Fourth Division, 1976–77 Second Division
- Southampton Player of the Season: 1975–76
