= 1989 Football League Second Division play-off final =

Association football match in England

- Event: 1988–89 Football League Second Division
Blackburn Rovers	Crystal Palace
3	4
- on aggregate

First leg
Blackburn Rovers	Crystal Palace
3	1
- Date: 31 May 1989
- Venue: Ewood Park, Blackburn
- Referee: Joe Worrall
- Attendance: 16,421

Second leg
Crystal Palace	Blackburn Rovers
3	0
- After extra time
- Date: 3 June 1989
- Venue: Selhurst Park, London
- Referee: George Courtney
- Attendance: 26,358

The 1989 Football League Second Division play-off final was an association football match played over two legs between Blackburn Rovers and Crystal Palace on 31 May 1989 and 3 June 1989. The final was to determine the third and final team to gain promotion from the Football League Second Division, the second tier of English football, to the First Division. The top two teams of the 1988–89 Football League Second Division season gained automatic promotion to the First Division, those placed from third to sixth in the league table competed play-off semi-finals. The winners of the semi-finals played against each other for the final place in the First Division for the 1989–90 season. Crystal Palace ended the season in third position, two places ahead of Blackburn Rovers, while Swindon Town and Watford were the other semi-finalists.

The first leg of the final took place at Blackburn's Ewood Park on 31 May 1989. Midway through the first half, Simon Garner flicked on a cross from Scott Sellars and Howard Gayle scored to make it 1–0 to Blackburn. In the 27th minute, Gayle doubled his side's lead with a half-volley from just outside the Palace penalty area. In the 70th minute, Jeff Hopkins brought Gayle down in the box and a penalty was awarded. Gayle took the spot kick himself but struck his shot wide of the goal. With four minutes of regular time remaining, Palace made it 2–1 through Eddie McGoldrick. Garner restored the two-goal lead in injury time, ending the match 3–1. Selhurst Park hosted the second leg of the final on 3 June 1989. Blackburn started the game strongly but Palace took the lead through Ian Wright who scored after 17 minutes from an Alan Pardew cross. A minute after half time, Mark Atkins tripped McGoldrick in the box to concede a penalty from which David Madden scored. Palace were 2–0 ahead at the end of regular time, and with the aggregate score being 3–3, the game went into extra time. With three minutes of the match remaining, Wright scored his 33rd goal of the season heading the ball from a McGoldrick cross past Terry Gennoe. The match ended 3–0 and Palace were promoted to the First Division with a 4–3 aggregate victory.

Crystal Palace ended the following season in fifteenth position in the First Division. Blackburn's next season saw them finish in fifth position in the Second Division and qualify for the play-offs where they lost to Swindon Town.

== Route to the final ==
Football League Second Division final table, leading positions
Pos	Team	Pld	W	D	L	GF	GA	GD	Pts
1	Chelsea	46	29	12	5	96	50	+46	99
2	Manchester City	46	23	13	10	77	53	+24	82
3	Crystal Palace	46	23	12	11	71	49	+22	81
4	Watford	46	22	12	12	74	48	+26	78
5	Blackburn Rovers	46	22	11	13	74	59	+15	77
6	Swindon Town	46	20	16	10	68	53	+15	76

Crystal Palace finished the regular 1988–89 season in third place in the Football League First Division – the second tier of the English football league system – two places and four points ahead of Blackburn Rovers. Both missed out on the two automatic places for promotion to the First Division and instead took part in the play-offs, along with Watford and Swindon Town, to determine the third promoted team. Crystal Palace finished one point behind Manchester City (who were promoted in second place) and eighteen behind league winners Chelsea.

Blackburn Rovers faced Watford in their play-off semi-final, with the first leg taking place at Ewood Park in Blackburn on 21 May 1989. The game was described by Stephen Bierley in The Guardian as "hot, hectic and mostly horrible." The home side made the better start but the match ended goalless with misses from Howard Gayle and Scott Sellars, while Neil Redfearn's shot for Watford in the second half was saved by Terry Gennoe. The return leg was played three days later at Vicarage Road in Watford. Simon Garner put Blackburn ahead after beating Paul Miller and Kenny Jackett and striking the ball past Tony Coton in the Watford goal. Redfearn equalised on 29 minutes with a long-range strike which took a deflection off John Millar to beat Gennoe. Ending 1–1, the game moved into extra time but with no further change to the score, Blackburn progressed to the play-off final on the away goals rule.

In the other play-off semi-final, Crystal Palace's opponents were Swindon Town, and the first leg was played at the County Ground, Swindon, on 21 May 1989. The match was dominated by Swindon but the first half ended goalless. In the 53rd minute, Crystal Palace's captain Jeff Hopkins scored an own goal after a dangerous cross from Dave Hockaday. Swindon manager Lou Macari suggested that his side were favourites going into the second leg but added "we shan't be defending". The return leg took place at Selhurst Park three days later. The largest crowd of the season meant congestion caused the kick off to be delayed by fifteen minutes. On eight minutes, Mark Bright scored his 25th goal of the season after Paul Digby had beaten away a shot from David Madden, to put Palace ahead. Seven minutes before half-time, Ian Wright doubled the lead after scoring from a Bright header. The match ended 2–0 and Crystal Palace qualified for the final with a 2–1 aggregate win.

== Match ==
=== Background ===
Neither side had featured in a play-off final although Blackburn Rovers had lost in the semi-finals during the 1988 Football League play-offs. Crystal Palace had played in the second tier of English football since being relegated in the 1980–81 season, while Blackburn had been in the Second Division since they were promoted in the 1979–80 season. During the regular 1988–89 season, Blackburn Rovers had won their home game between the two sides 5–4 in October, while the clubs played out a 2–2 draw at Vicarage Road the following February. Garner was Blackburn's leading scorer during the regular season with 23 goals across all competitions (20 in the league, 1 in the FA Cup and 2 in the League Cup), followed by Gayle who scored 20 in total (19 in the league, 1 in the FA Cup and 1 in the League Cup). The leading marksman for Crystal Palace was Wright who had scored 30 goals during the regular season comprising 24 in the league, 1 in the FA Cup, and 5 in the League Cup.

=== First leg ===
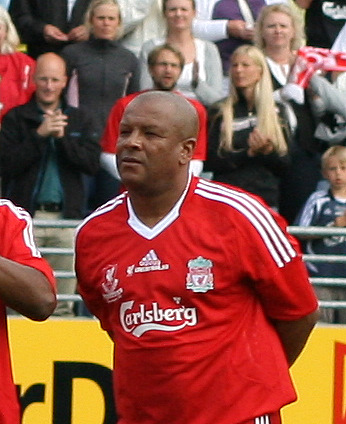
Howard Gayle (pictured in 2010) scored two first-half goals for Blackburn Rovers in the first leg of the final.

==== Pre-match ====
In a training session leading up to the first leg of the final, the Blackburn manager Don Mackay tore ankle ligaments, but suggested it had helped to relax his players: "There was a lot of tension in the air until the players saw me hobbling about." He had a fully fit squad to choose from. Crystal Palace had Gavin Nebbeling available for selection after suspension.

==== Summary ====
The first leg of the final took place at Blackburn's Ewood Park on 31 May 1989 in front of a crowd of 16,421 and was refereed by Joe Worrall. In the 13th minute, a chance fell to Garner as he volleyed a cross from Chris Sulley, but Perry Suckling in the Crystal Palace goal saved the shot. Eight minutes later, Garner flicked on a cross from Sellars and Gayle scored to make it 1–0 to Blackburn. In the 27th minute, Gayle doubled his side's lead with a half-volley from just outside the Palace penalty area after David Burke had failed to clear the ball.

Blackburn continued to dominate the match in the second half, with Hopkins almost scoring an own goal and Millar striking a shot wide of the Palace goal. On 57 minutes, Palace made the only substitution of the game, with Glenn Pennyfather coming on for Madden. In the 70th minute, Hopkins brought Gayle down in the box and a penalty was awarded. Gayle took the spot kick himself but missed out on his hat-trick after he struck his shot wide of the goal. With four minutes of regular time remaining, Palace made it 2–1. John Pemberton's free kick was headed on by Wright to Eddie McGoldrick who scored his first goal of the season from close range. Garner restored the two-goal lead in injury time with a tap-in from a Gayle cross, ending the match 3–1. After the match, Garner warned that, despite the lead, that his team would "be treating the second leg as if the score was 0–0."

==== Details ====
31 May 1989
19:45

Blackburn Rovers	3–1	Crystal Palace
Gayle 21', 27'; Garner 90'		McGoldrick 86'

Ewood Park, Blackburn
Attendance: 16,421
Referee: Joe Worrall (Cheshire)

Blackburn Rovers	Crystal Palace

Terry Gennoe Mark Atikins Chris Sulley Nicky Reid Colin Hendry David Mail Howard Gayle John Millar Paul Miller Simon Garner Scott Sellars Manager: Don Mackay	Perry Suckling John Pemberton David Burke David Madden (substituted off) 57' Jeff Hopkins Rudi Hedman Eddie McGoldrick Alan Pardew Mark Bright Ian Wright Phil Barber Substitutes Glenn Pennyfather (substituted on) 57' Manager: Steve Coppell

=== Second leg ===
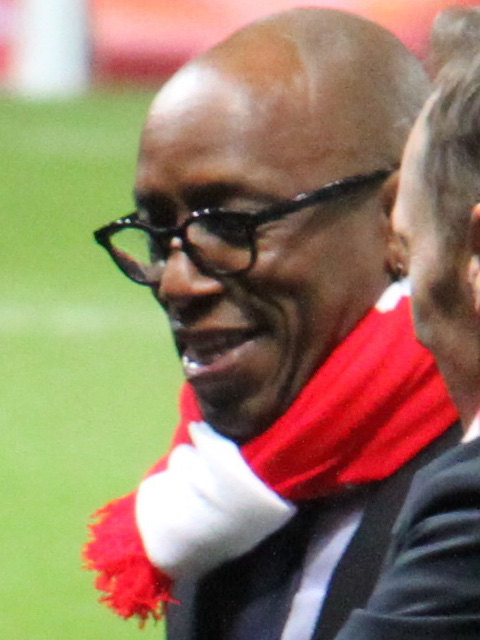
Ian Wright (pictured in 2015) scored two goals for Crystal Palace in the second leg of the final.

==== Pre-match ====
Crystal Palace had been hoping to temporarily increase the capacity of Selhurst Park by 7,000 to 38,000. Geoff Thomas, the Palace captain, was available for selection after an extended period of absence as a result of a stomach operation. Blackburn's Hendry was carrying a leg injury.

==== Summary ====
The second leg of the final took place at Selhurst Park on 3 June 1989 and was refereed by George Courtney in front of a crowd of 26,358. Blackburn started the game strongly but Palace's defence kept the score goalless. Palace took the lead through Wright who scored from after 17 minutes from an Alan Pardew cross. Wright then saw his volley from the edge of the box tipped round the post by Gennoe, before a header from McGoldrick went wide of the Blackburn goal. A minute after half time, Atkins tripped McGoldrick in the box to concede a penalty from which Madden scored, sending the Blackburn goalkeeper Gennoe the wrong way. Six minutes later, a poor backpass from Gary O'Reilly was claimed from Garner's feet by the Palace goalkeeper Suckling. On 56 minutes, Sean Curry came on to replace Miller in the first substitution of the game. With Palace 2–0 ahead at the end of regular time, the aggregate score was 3–3 and the game went into extra time. On 105 minutes, Blackburn made their second change of the game with Gayle being replaced by Alan Ainscow. With three minutes of the match remaining, Wright scored his 33rd goal of the season heading the ball from a McGoldrick cross past Gennoe. The match ended 3–0 and Palace were promoted to the First Division with a 4–3 aggregate victory.

=== Details ===
3 June 1989
15:00

Crystal Palace	3–0 (a.e.t.)	Blackburn Rovers
Wright 17', 117'; Madden 47' (pen.)

Selhurst Park, London
Attendance: 26,358
Referee: George Courtney (County Durham)

Crystal Palace	Blackburn Rovers

Perry Suckling John Pemberton David Burke David Madden Jeff Hopkins Gary O'Reilly Eddie McGoldrick Alan Pardew Mark Bright Ian Wright Phil Barber Manager: Steve Coppell	Terry Gennoe Mark Atikins Chris Sulley Nicky Reid Colin Hendry David Mail Howard Gayle John Millar (substituted off) 105' Paul Miller (substituted off) 56' Simon Garner Scott Sellars Substitutes Alan Ainscow (substituted on) 105' Sean Curry (substituted on) 56' Manager: Don Mackay

== Post-match ==
Coppell stated that he had a fulfilled his five-year ambition at Crystal Palace: "It is five years tomorrow since I joined the club as manager. I said then that promotion was a five-year job." Wright, who had signed from non-League club Greenwich Borough five years earlier, had been confident of promotion: "I had faith in the club. I knew we could do it. We are ready for the First Division."

Crystal Palace ended the following season in fifteenth position in the First Division, having conceded more goals than any other team. Blackburn's next season saw them finish in fifth position in the Second Division and qualify for the 1990 Football League play-offs where they lost 4–2 on aggregate to Swindon Town.
