= New Milton Town F.C. =

Association football club in England

Coordinates: 50°44′46″N 1°40′22″W

New Milton Town
- Full name: New Milton Town Football Club
- Nickname: The Brickmakers
- Founded: 1998
- Ground: Fawcetts Field, New Milton
- Capacity: 3,000 (262 seated)
- Chairman: Gary Squires
- Manager: Jamie Kay
- League: Wessex League Division One
- 2025–26: Wessex League Premier Division, 20th of 20 (relegated)
- Website: newmiltontownfc.co.uk
Home colours	Away colours

New Milton Town Football Club is a football club based in New Milton, Hampshire, England. They are currently members of the Wessex League Division One and play at Fawcetts Field.

== History ==
The club was established in 1998 under the name Lymington & New Milton as a merger of AFC Lymington from the Wessex League and New Milton Town from Division Two of the Hampshire League, with the new club playing at New Milton Town's Fawcetts Field ground. The amalgamation of the two clubs also led to the formation of Lymington Town, who entered Division Three of the Hampshire League, and a new New Milton club based in Milford-on-Sea, who joined Division Two for a single season before folding. In their first season, Lymington & New Milton retained the Wessex League title won by AFC Lymington in 1997–98. However, they were unable to take promotion as their ground failed to meet the requirements. They were runners-up in the league in each of the next two seasons, making another failed application for promotion in 1999–2000.

In 2004–05 Lymington & New Milton were Wessex League champions, earning promotion to Division One of the Isthmian League. However, after a single season in the Isthmian League, they were transferred to Division One South & West of the Southern League. Despite finishing above the relegation zone in 2006–07, the club resigned from the league at the end of the season after most of the club's officials resigned. Dropping back into the Premier Division of the Wessex League, the club were renamed New Milton Town. In 2012–13 they finished bottom of the Premier Division and were relegated to Division One after rescinding their resignation from the league when a proposed merger with Bashley fell through. The 2024–25 season saw the club win the Division One title, earning promotion to the Premier Division. However, in 2025–26 they finished bottom of the Premier Division and were relegated back to Division One.

== Ground ==
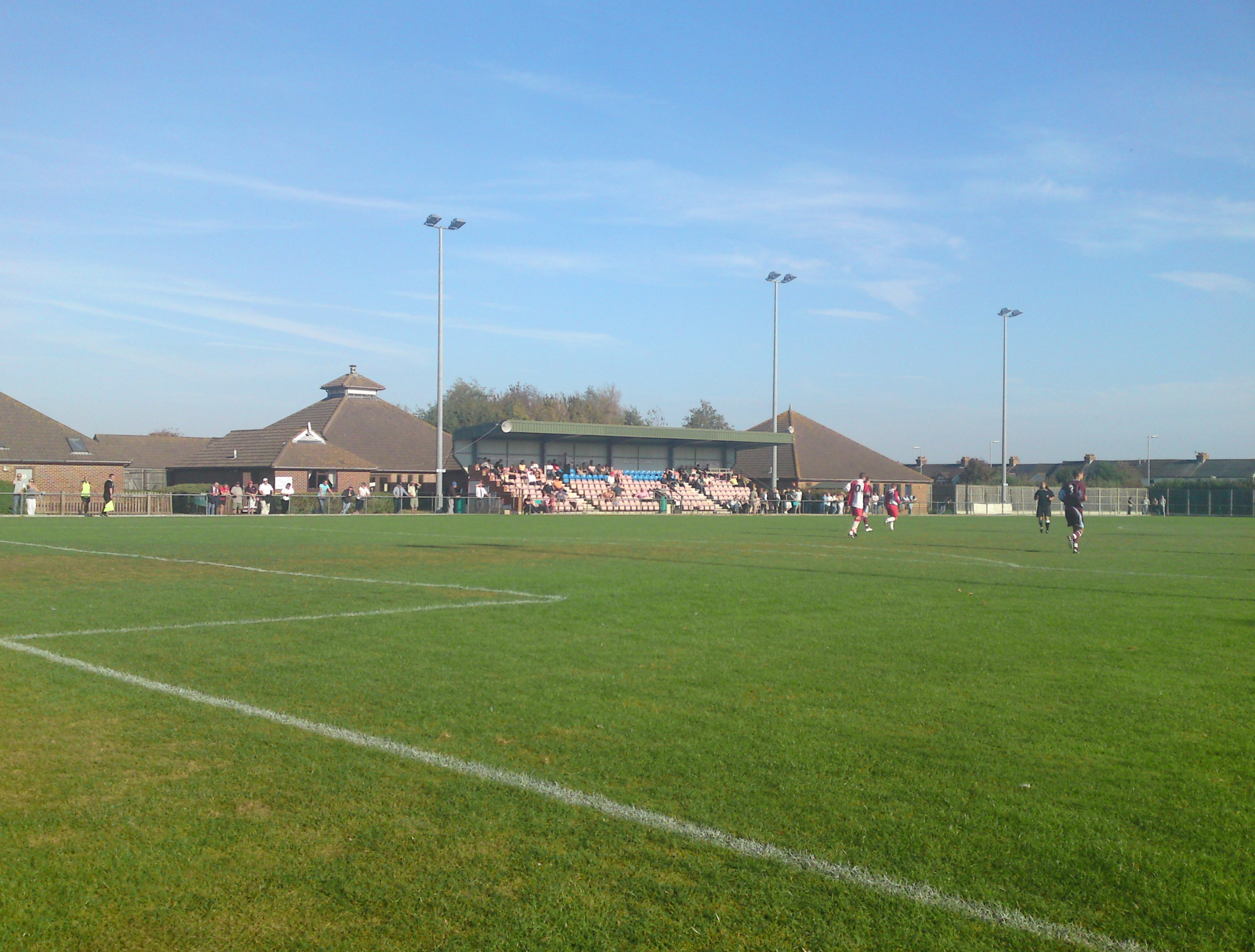
Fawcetts Field

The club play at Fawcetts Field on Christchurch Road. The ground has a cantilever seated stand on one side of the pitch, with the other three sides left undeveloped. It has a capacity of 3,000, of which 262 is seated.

== Honours ==
- Wessex League
  - Premier Division champions 1998–99, 2004–05
  - Division One champions 2024–25

== Records ==
- Best FA Cup performance: Fourth qualifying round, 1999–2000, 2003–04, 2004–05
- Best FA Trophy performance: First qualifying round, 2005–06
- Best FA Vase performance: Quarter-finals, 1998–99

== See also ==
- New Milton Town F.C. players
- New Milton Town F.C. managers
