= Wellworthy Athletic F.C. =

- Full name: Wellworthy Athletic Football Club
- Founded: 1927
- Dissolved: 1988 – merged with Lymington Town
- Ground: Ampress Works Ground, Lymington
Home colours	Away colours

Wellworthy Athletic F.C. were an amateur football team based in Lymington, Hampshire. The club existed for over 60 years until the loss of their ground in 1988.

== History ==
Wellworthy Athletic were founded in 1927 as the works side of Lymington based Wellworthy Engineering (manufacturers of automotive and aerospace components).

They originally played at Victory Park in the Bournemouth League where they climbed up through the ranks to win promotion to the Hampshire League Division 2 in 1932. Initially, they did well, finishing runners-up in 1932–33 but were relegated after finishing bottom in 1934–35.

After a spell playing in the New Forest League, Wellworthy returned to the Hampshire League in 1949 when they were placed in Division 3 West. Initially, the club again did well as they challenged for promotion, twice finishing third and as runners-up in 1950–51. Throughout the decade Wellworthy remained a consistent mid-table side, with the main highlight coming when the side reached the Hampshire Intermediate Cup final in 1956–57. However, the early sixties saw a decline in fortunes and after two seasons of struggle, they were relegated in 1960–61.

In 1970 Wellworthy opened their privately owned ground within the Ampress Works site, and re-established themselves as a force in the Bournemouth League.

In the 1984–85 season they completed a double by winning the Division 1 title and the Pickford Cup. They were also finalists in the Hampshire Intermediate Cup, but were denied the treble by neighbours Bashley.

These successes were enough for Wellworthy to return to the Hampshire League for the 1985–86 campaign, being placed in Division 3. Here, they made a strong challenge for the title, before eventually coming second in a two-horse race with Liphook.

For the 1986–87 season, the Wessex League was formed and Wellworthy were surprisingly elected despite only meeting the basic ground requirements. Despite the big step up, they held their own and they did extremely well to finish in a very creditable seventh place.

The 1987–88 campaign saw Wellworthy finish lower mid-table, but they reached the semi-finals of the Hampshire Senior Cup. En route, they defeated Waterlooville and Portsmouth Reserves both 2–0, before losing by the same score against eventual winners Gosport Borough. However, there was some consolation when they won the Bournemouth Senior Cup.

In 1988 it was announced that Wellworthy were to be taken over by the American company Federal Mogul, with the Ampress Works to be closed down and sold. At the same time, league rivals and near neighbours Lymington Town were struggling, so the two clubs merged to form AFC Lymington.

== Honours ==
- Hampshire League
  - Division 2 Runners-up 1932/33
  - Division 3 Runners-up 1985/86
  - Division 3 West Runners-up 1950/51
- Hampshire Football Association
  - Intermediate Cup Finalists 1956/57 and 1984/85
- Bournemouth League
  - Division 1 Champions 1984/85
- Bournemouth Football Association
  - Senior Cup Winners 1987/88, Finalists 1953/54
  - Pickford Cup Winners 1984/85
- New Forest League
  - Division 1 Champions 1948/49
  - Perkins Charity Cup Winners 1948/49 and 1949/50, Finalists 1968/69

== League career ==
Season	Division	Position	Significant events
1932/33	Hampshire League Division 2	2/13	Runners-up, but not promoted
1933/34	Hampshire League Division 2	6/12	
1934/35	Hampshire League Division 2	16/16	Relegated
1935-48	New Forest League		
1949/50	Hampshire League Division 3 West	3/14	
1950/51	Hampshire League Division 3 West	2/14	Runners-up, but not promoted
1951/52	Hampshire League Division 3 West	3/14	
1952/53	Hampshire League Division 3 West	7/14	
1953/54	Hampshire League Division 3 West	9/14	
1954/55	Hampshire League Division 3 West	8/11	
1955/56	Hampshire League Division 3	11/16	
1956/57	Hampshire League Division 3	10/16	
1957/58	Hampshire League Division 3	9/16	
1958/59	Hampshire League Division 3	8/16	
1959/60	Hampshire League Division 3	14/16	
1960/61	Hampshire League Division 3	15/16	Relegated
1961-85	Bournemouth League		
1985/86	Hampshire League Division 3	2/18	Runners-up, Joined Wessex League
1986/87	Wessex League	7/17	
1987/88	Wessex League	15/19	Merged with Lymington Town

== Ground ==
Wellworthy Athletic played at the Ampress Works Ground, Southampton Road, Lymington. The record attendance was in 1972 when they welcomed an Ex-Portsmouth XI to christen their newly installed floodlights in a game that drew 600 spectators to watch the sharing of eight goals. The site is now an industrial estate and the Social Club housing.

== Notable players ==
- See Wellworthy Athletic players.

== Local rivalries ==
Wellworthy enjoyed a healthy rivalry with number of New Forest clubs such as Brockenhurst, New Milton, Sway, Bashley, Ringwood Town, Pennington and especially Lymington Town.
