= David Madden (footballer) =

English footballer

Personal information
- Date of birth: 6 January 1963 (age 63)
- Place of birth: Stepney, England
- Position: Midfielder

Youth career
- Southampton

Senior career*
Years	Team	Apps	(Gls)
1981–1983	Southampton	0	(0)
1982	→ AFC Bournemouth (loan)	5	(0)
1983–1984	Arsenal	2	(0)
1984–1985	Charlton Athletic	20	(1)
1985–1987	Los Angeles Lazers		
1987–1988	Reading	9	(1)
1988–1990	Crystal Palace	27	(5)
1989	→ Birmingham City (loan)	5	(1)
1990–1991	Maidstone United	10	(0)
Total		78	(8)
- * Club domestic league appearances and goals

David Madden (born 6 January 1963) is an English retired professional footballer who played in the 1990 FA Cup Final with Crystal Palace.

== Career ==
Beginning as an apprentice at Southampton, Madden had a loan spell at AFC Bournemouth before joining Arsenal in summer of 1983. He mainly played for Arsenal's reserve side but also made two First Division appearances; he made his debut against West Bromwich Albion on 3 December 1983, and his second match was a week later at his boyhood heroes West Ham United. He was granted a free transfer at the end of the 1983–84 season.

He moved to Charlton Athletic and had later spells with the Los Angeles Lazers, Reading, Crystal Palace, Birmingham City and Maidstone United. After retiring as a player in 1991, Madden became assistant manager of Maidstone United. Whilst at Palace, although he missed a substantial part of the season through injury, Madden made 19 appearances, scoring five times, in 1988–89 when the club achieved promotion via the play-offs. In the play-off final second leg, against Blackburn Rovers, Madden scored a penalty to make the score 2–0 to Palace (3–3 on aggregate) and take the game to extra time when a goal from Ian Wright secured promotion. Madden also appeared in both the 1990 FA Cup Final and replay against Manchester United as a substitute.

== Honours ==
Crystal Palace

- Football League Second Division play-offs: 1989
- FA Cup runner-up: 1989–90
