= EFL Championship play-offs =

Annual postseason elimination tournament of English Football League Championship

- Sport: Football
- Founded: 1987
- No. of teams: 6
- Region: England; Wales
- Broadcasters: United Kingdom: Sky Sports; International: Varies by territory
- Streaming partners: United Kingdom: Sky Go; NOW TV; International: Varies by region

The English Football League (EFL) Championship play-offs are a series of play-off matches contested by the association football teams finishing from third to eighth in the EFL Championship table and are part of the EFL playoffs. From the 2026–27 season, the play-offs comprise six teams. The teams finishing third and fourth progress directly to the semi-finals, while the teams finishing fifth to eighth contest single-leg eliminator matches. The team finishing fifth plays the team finishing eighth, while the team finishing sixth plays the team finishing seventh, with the higher-ranked team hosting each eliminator. The winners of the eliminators progress to the two-legged semi-finals, where the team finishing third plays the lowest-ranked remaining team and the team finishing fourth plays the highest-ranked remaining team. The winners of the semi-finals progress to the final at Wembley Stadium. The winner of the final is promoted to the Premier League. The Championship play-off final is considered the most valuable single football match in the world as a result of the increase in revenue to the winning club from sponsorship and media agreements.

Prior to the 2026–27 season, the play-offs comprised four teams, with the teams finishing third to sixth contesting two-legged semi-finals. The team finishing third played the team finishing sixth, while the team finishing fourth played the team finishing fifth.

== Format ==
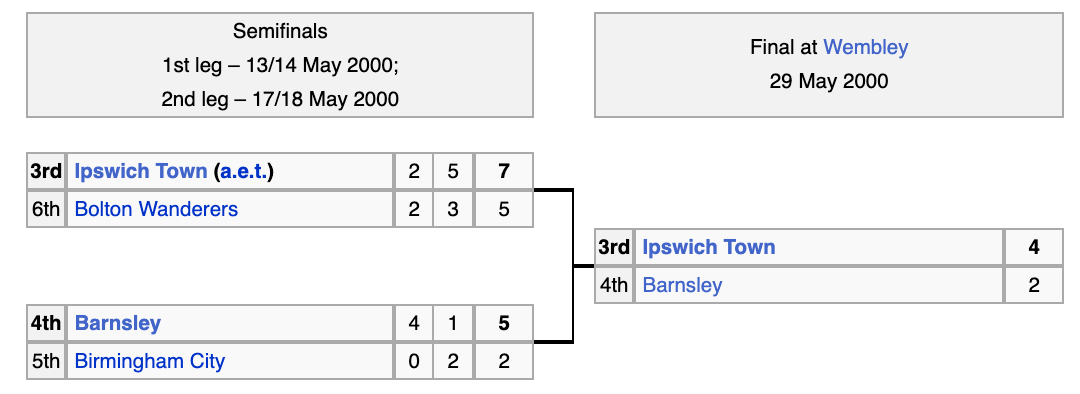
An example of the play-off format, from the 2000 First Division play-offs

From the 2026–27 season, the Championship play-offs involve the six teams that finish directly below the automatic promotion places in the EFL Championship, the second tier of the English football league system. These teams meet in a series of play-off matches to determine the final team that will be promoted to the Premier League. The teams finishing third and fourth in the league table progress directly to the play-off semi-finals, while the teams finishing fifth to eighth contest a preliminary "eliminator" round.

The eliminator round consists of two one-legged matches. The team finishing fifth plays the team finishing eighth, while the team finishing sixth plays the team finishing seventh. The higher-ranked team hosts each eliminator. The winners of the two eliminators progress to the semi-finals.

The semi-finals are contested over two legs. The third-placed team plays the lowest-ranked team remaining in the play-offs, while the fourth-placed team plays the highest-ranked team remaining. The higher-ranked side hosts the second leg. This means that the third-placed team is guaranteed to face the lowest-ranked of the two eliminator winners, while the fourth-placed team faces the other winner.

The winner of each semi-final is determined by the aggregate score across the two legs, with the number of goals scored in each match of the tie being added together. The team with the higher aggregate score qualifies for the final. If, at the end of the regular 90 minutes of the second leg, the aggregate score is level then the match goes into extra time where two 15-minute halves are played. If the score remains level at the end of extra time, the tie is decided by a penalty shootout. The away goals rule does not apply in the play-off semi-finals.

The clubs that win the semi-finals then meet at Wembley Stadium, a neutral venue, for a one-off match referred to as the "play-off final". If required, extra time and a penalty shootout can be employed in the same manner as for the semi-finals to determine the winner. The runner-up and losing semi-finalists remain in the Championship while the winning side is promoted. The match, along with the finals of the League One and League Two play-offs, usually takes place over the long weekend of the second bank holiday in May.

For the first three years, the play-off final took place over two legs, played at both sides' grounds. Charlton Athletic won the first Second Division play-off final in 1987, requiring a replay to defeat Leeds United. From 1990, the play-off final was a one-off match, hosted at the original Wembley Stadium, while from 2001 to 2006, the final was played at the Millennium Stadium in Cardiff as Wembley was being rebuilt. Since 2007, the match has been hosted at Wembley Stadium.

== Background ==
The mid-1980s saw a decline in attendances at football matches and public disenchantment with English football. A number of instances of violence and tragedy struck the game. In March 1985 at the semi-final of the 1984–85 Football League Cup between Chelsea and Sunderland where more than 100 people were arrested after various invasions of the Stamford Bridge pitch and more than 40 people, including 20 policemen, were injured. Nine days later, violence flared at the FA Cup match between Millwall and Luton Town: seats were used as missiles against the police and resulted in Luton Town banning away supporters. On 11 May, 56 people were killed and 265 injured in the Bradford City stadium fire and less than three weeks later, 39 supporters died and more than 600 were injured in the Heysel Stadium disaster where Liverpool were playing Juventus in the European Cup final.

Initially the Play-Offs would operate for two years, but if they proved popular with spectators they could become a permanent part of the calendar.

— Heathrow Agreement

In an attempt to persuade fans to return to the stadia, the Football League had rejected a £19 million television deal to broadcast matches live on the BBC and ITV before the 1985–86 Football League season with League president Jack Dunnett suggesting that "football is prepared to have a year or two with no television". In December 1985, the "Heathrow Agreement" was agreed which aimed to revitalise the financial affairs of the league. It was a ten-point plan which included a structural reorganisation of the league, reducing the top tier from 22 clubs to 20, and the introduction of play-offs to facilitate the change. The play-offs were introduced to the end of the 1986–87 Football League season. They were initially introduced for two years with the proviso that if they were successful with the general public, they would be retained permanently.

== History ==
In the first two seasons, the team one place above the relegation zone in the First Division, along with the three clubs below the automatic promotion positions in the Second Division, took part in the play-offs. In the inaugural play-off final, First Division Charlton Athletic faced Second Division Leeds United but they could not be separated over the two home-and-away legs, so the tie was settled in a replay. Played at a neutral ground, St Andrew's in Birmingham, Charlton won the game 2–1 after extra time to retain their First Division status, while Leeds remained in the Second Division. The following season, Middlesbrough beat Chelsea 2–1 on aggregate, and replaced them in the First Division. The primary objective of the play-offs was achieved within the first two seasons, namely the reorganisation of the four leagues with 20 clubs in the first tier and 24 in the second to fourth tiers. However, the popularity of the play-offs was such that the post-season games were retained and the 1989 play-offs were first to feature four teams from the Second Division: Crystal Palace beat Blackburn Rovers 4–3 over two legs after extra time in the final.

EFL Championship play-off nomenclature
| Years | Name |
|---|---|
| 1987–1992 | Football League Second Division play-offs |
| 1993–2004 | Football League First Division play-offs |
| 2005–2015 | Football League Championship play-offs |
| 2016–present | EFL Championship play-offs |

From 1990, the format of the final changed to a single match played at a neutral venue, initially the original Wembley Stadium. The first winners of the inaugural one-off final were Swindon Town who defeated Sunderland 1–0 in the final in front of 72,873 spectators. Ten days after the final, Swindon were found guilty on 35 counts of illegal player payments and were given a two-division relegation. This meant that Sunderland were promoted to the First Division in Swindon's place. Wembley underwent renovations early in the 21st century and the 2000 final was the last to be hosted at the original stadium. Subsequently the finals were hosted at the Millennium Stadium in Cardiff, where Bolton Wanderers beat Preston North End 3–0 in the final. The Millennium Stadium held the finals until 2007 when the match was moved to the renovated Wembley Stadium, the first such final seeing Derby County defeat West Bromwich Albion 1–0. The final in 2020 was held behind closed doors as a result of the COVID-19 pandemic in the United Kingdom: Fulham defeated Brentford 2–1 after extra time in front of an official attendance of 0.

Since the first play-off final, the second tier of English football's league itself has undergone a number of re-brands. In 1993, the Premier League was formed, a move which caused the second-tier league to be renamed as the First Division. In 2004, the First Division was re-branded as the Football League Championship, before the League's adoption of English Football League (EFL) led to a 2016 renaming as the EFL Championship.

The four-team format remained in place through the 2025–26 season, with the teams finishing third to sixth contesting the semi-finals. From the 2026–27 season, the competition was expanded to six teams. The teams finishing third and fourth receive a bye to the semi-finals, while the teams finishing fifth to eighth contest two single-leg eliminators. The change was approved by EFL clubs in March 2026.

== Prize ==
While there is no financial prize for the winners, the match is still referred to as the most valuable single football match in the world as a result of ensuing commercial and media benefits. Accountants Deloitte described the 2020 final as the "contest for biggest financial prize in world football" with promotion worth at least £85 million in the first season after promotion and an additional £80 million the following season should an immediate relegation be avoided. By convention, the two finalists agree that the loser will keep all the gate receipts from the game, so as to slightly soften the financial blow of missing out, however, in the 2015 Football League Championship play-off final, Norwich City refused and took half of the gate receipts after also gaining promotion. The winning team is also presented with a trophy.

== Winners and semi-finalists ==
Key to list of winners and semi-finalists
| Year | Link to play-off article for specified year |
|---|---|
| Venue | Location(s) of the final match(es) |
| Winner (X) | Team that won play-off final, (X) indicates cumulative number of play-off final victories |
| Final | Link to play-off final article for the specified match |
| ^ | Final played over two legs |
| R | Final decided by a replay |
| † | Final decided in extra time |
| ‡ | Final decided by a penalty shoot-out |
| Runner-up | Team that lost play-off final |
| Semi-finalists | Two teams that lost in play-off semi-finals |

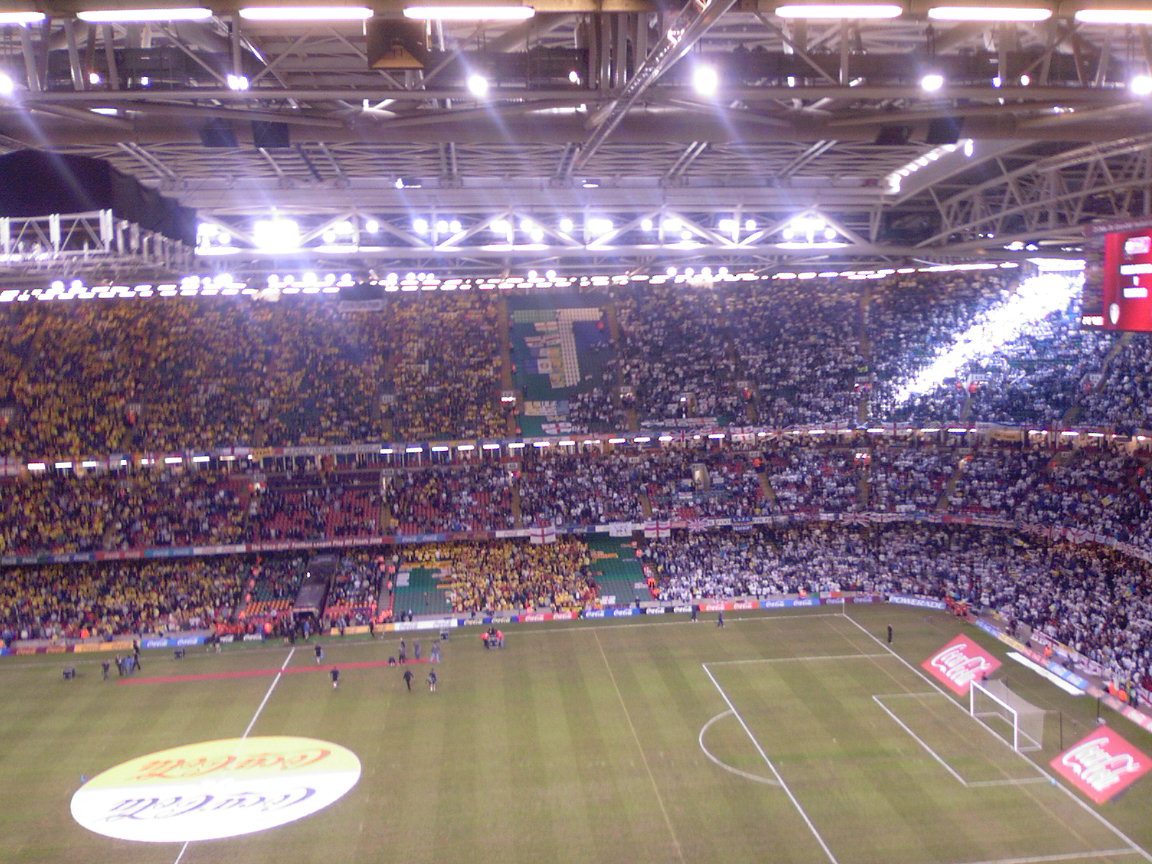
Supporters at the Millennium Stadium in 2006 where Watford beat Leeds United 3–0 in the final.

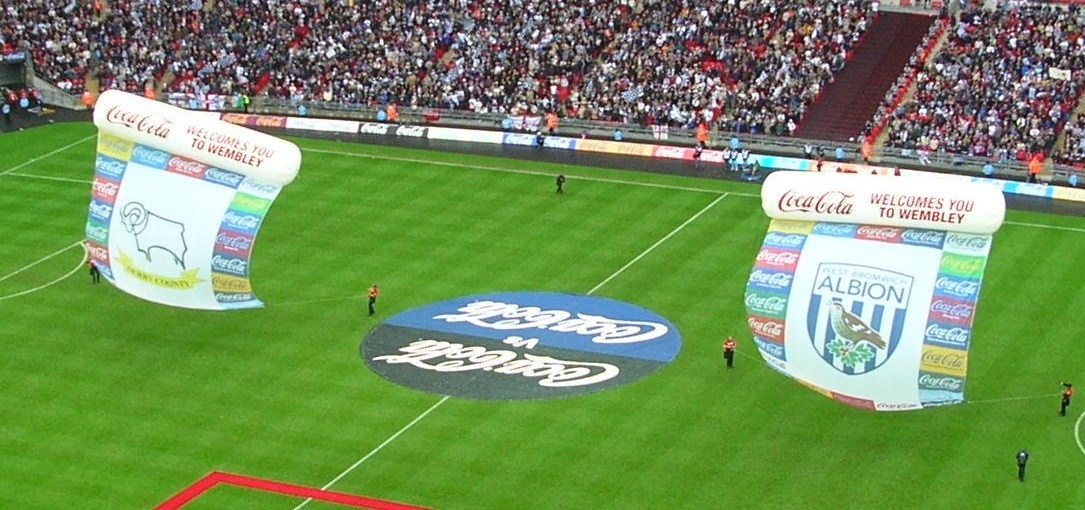
Derby County and West Bromwich Albion crests before kick-off at the Wembley Stadium final in 2007

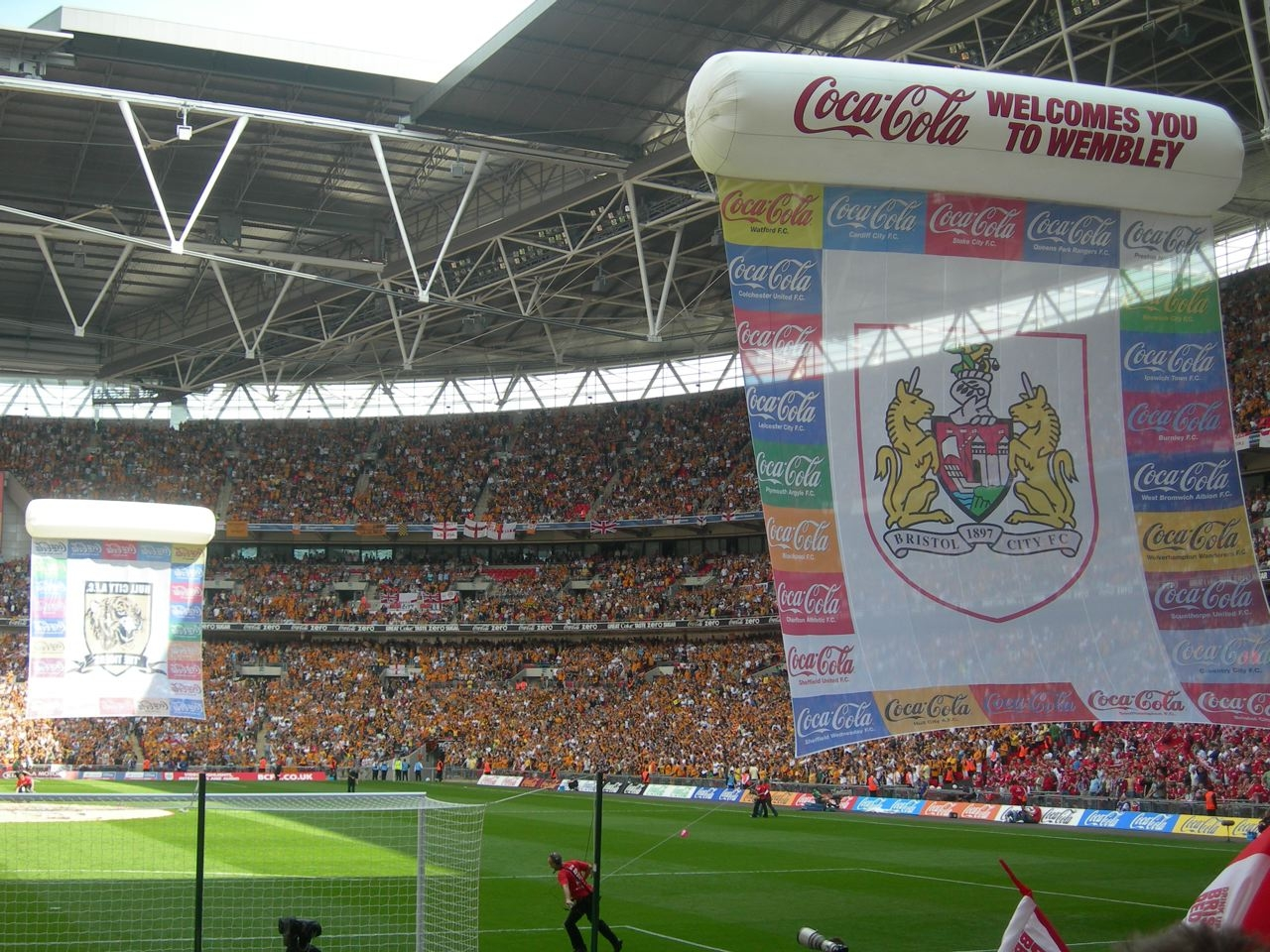
The crests of Bristol City and Hull City, prior to the final in 2008

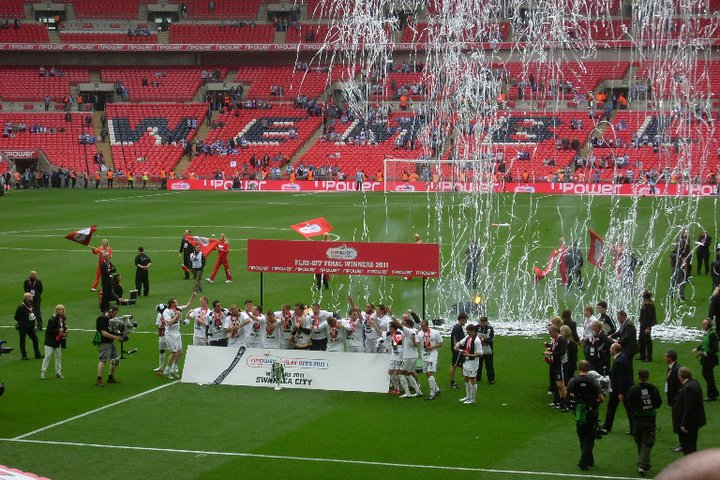
Players of Swansea City celebrating the play-off final victory at Wembley Stadium in 2011

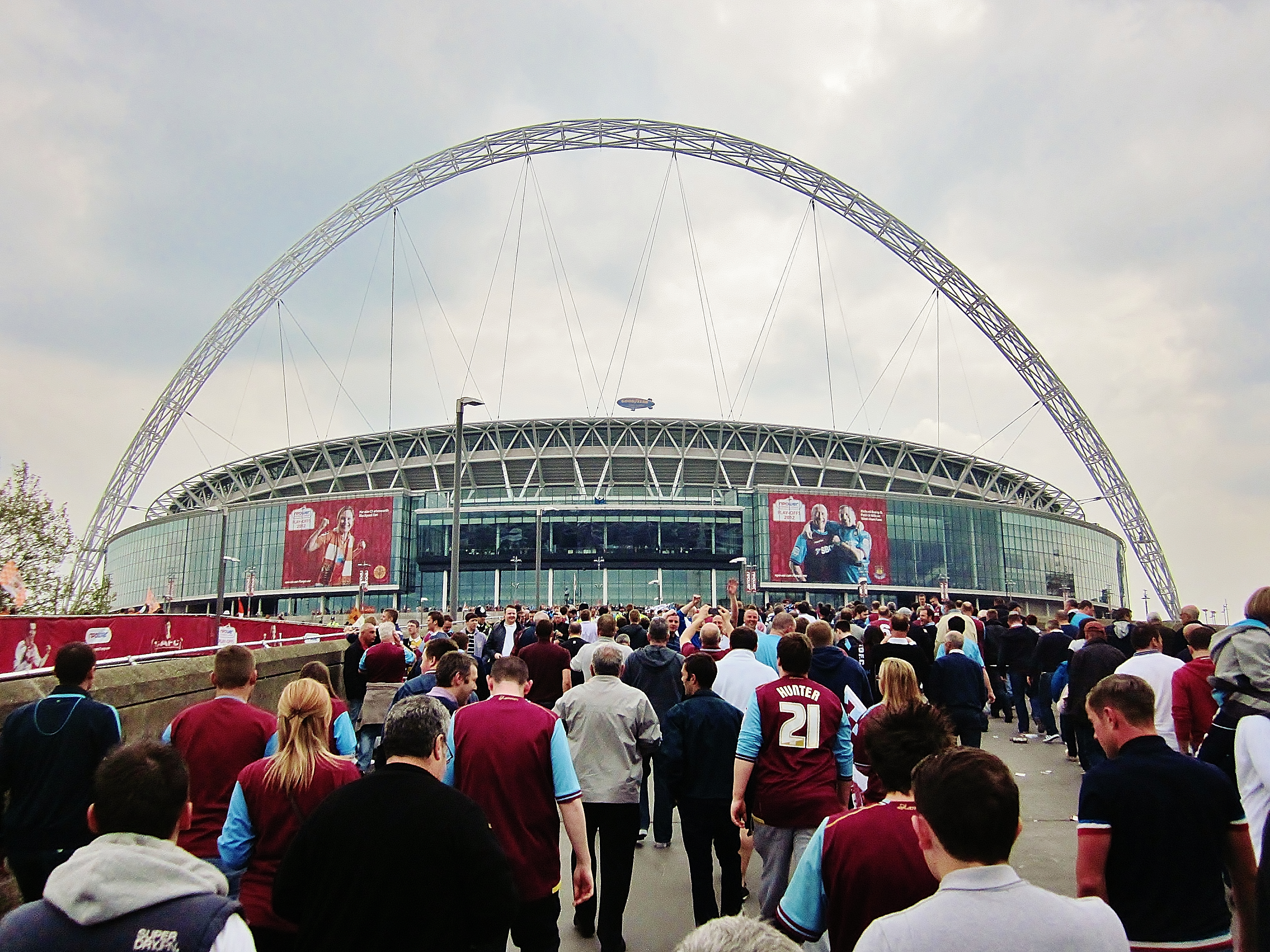
Fans arriving at the final at Wembley Stadium in 2012

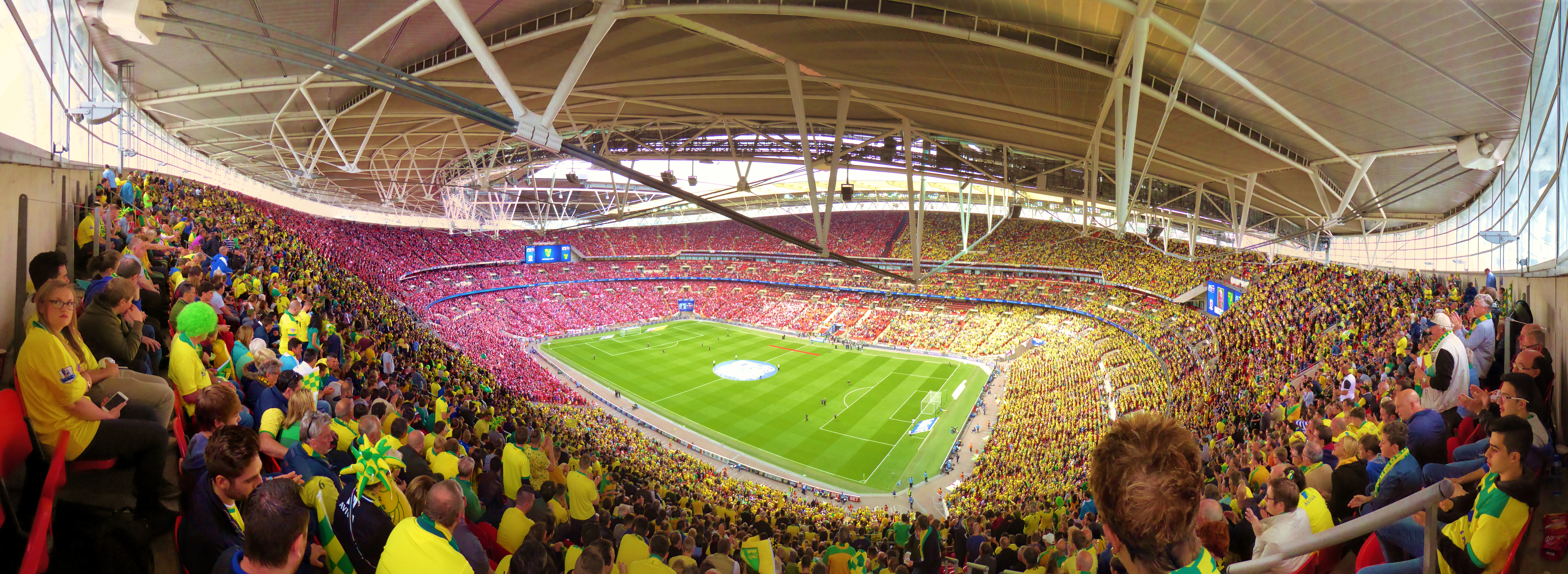
Panorama of Wembley Stadium in the 2015 final where Norwich City beat Middlesbrough

Winners of the EFL Championship play-offs along with runners-up and semi-finalists
| Year | Venue | Winner | Final | Runner-up | Semi-finalists | Ref. |
|---|---|---|---|---|---|---|
| 1987 | Selhurst Park/Elland Road ^ | Charlton Athletic (1) | 1–1 | Leeds United | Oldham Athletic; Ipswich Town | |
| 1987 (R) | St Andrew's | Charlton Athletic (1) | 2–1 | Leeds United | Oldham Athletic; Ipswich Town | |
| 1988 | Ayresome Park/Stamford Bridge ^ | Middlesbrough (1) | 2–1 | Chelsea | Bradford City; Blackburn Rovers | |
| 1989 | Ewood Park/Selhurst Park ^ | Crystal Palace (1) | 4–3 | Blackburn Rovers | Watford; Swindon Town | |
| 1990 | Wembley Stadium (original) | Swindon Town (1) (Note: Due to financial irregularities, Swindon Town were prevented from taking their place in the top division, which was instead awarded to the losing finalists, Sunderland.) | 1–0 | Sunderland | Newcastle United; Blackburn Rovers | |
| 1991 | Wembley Stadium (original) | Notts County (1) | 3–1 | Brighton & Hove Albion | Millwall; Middlesbrough | |
| 1992 | Wembley Stadium (original) | Blackburn Rovers (1) | 1–0 | Leicester City | Derby County; Cambridge United | |
| 1993 | Wembley Stadium (original) | Swindon Town (2) | 4–3 | Leicester City | Portsmouth; Tranmere Rovers | |
| 1994 | Wembley Stadium (original) | Leicester City (1) | 2–1 | Derby County | Millwall; Tranmere Rovers | |
| 1995 | Wembley Stadium (original) | Bolton Wanderers (1) | 4–3 † | Reading | Wolverhampton Wanderers; Tranmere Rovers | |
| 1996 | Wembley Stadium (original) | Leicester City (2) | 2–1 † | Crystal Palace | Stoke City; Charlton Athletic | |
| 1997 | Wembley Stadium (original) | Crystal Palace (2) | 1–0 | Sheffield United | Wolverhampton Wanderers; Ipswich Town | |
| 1998 | Wembley Stadium (original) | Charlton Athletic (2) | 4–4 ‡ (Note: Charlton Athletic won the 1998 Football League First Division play-off final with a 7–6 penalty shoot-out victory over Sunderland.) | Sunderland | Ipswich Town; Sheffield United | |
| 1999 | Wembley Stadium (original) | Watford (1) | 2–0 | Bolton Wanderers | Ipswich Town; Birmingham City | |
| 2000 | Wembley Stadium (original) | Ipswich Town (1) | 4–2 | Barnsley | Birmingham City; Bolton Wanderers | |
| 2001 | Millennium Stadium | Bolton Wanderers (2) | 3–0 | Preston North End | Birmingham City; West Bromwich Albion | |
| 2002 | Millennium Stadium | Birmingham City (1) | 1–1 ‡ (Note: Birmingham City won the 2002 Football League First Division play-off final with a 4–2 penalty shoot-out victory over Norwich City.) | Norwich City | Wolverhampton Wanderers; Millwall | |
| 2003 | Millennium Stadium | Wolverhampton Wanderers (1) | 3–0 | Sheffield United | Reading; Nottingham Forest | |
| 2004 | Millennium Stadium | Crystal Palace (3) | 1–0 | West Ham United | Sunderland; Ipswich Town | |
| 2005 | Millennium Stadium | West Ham United (1) | 1–0 | Preston North End | Ipswich Town; Derby County | |
| 2006 | Millennium Stadium | Watford (2) | 3–0 | Leeds United | Preston North End; Crystal Palace | |
| 2007 | Wembley Stadium | Derby County (1) | 1–0 | West Bromwich Albion | Wolverhampton Wanderers; Southampton | |
| 2008 | Wembley Stadium | Hull City (1) | 1–0 | Bristol City | Crystal Palace; Watford | |
| 2009 | Wembley Stadium | Burnley (1) | 1–0 | Sheffield United | Reading; Preston North End | |
| 2010 | Wembley Stadium | Blackpool (1) | 3–2 | Cardiff City | Nottingham Forest; Leicester City | |
| 2011 | Wembley Stadium | Swansea City (1) | 4–2 | Reading | Cardiff City; Nottingham Forest | |
| 2012 | Wembley Stadium | West Ham United (2) | 2–1 | Blackpool | Birmingham City; Cardiff City | |
| 2013 | Wembley Stadium | Crystal Palace (4) | 1–0 † | Watford | Brighton & Hove Albion; Leicester City | |
| 2014 | Wembley Stadium | Queens Park Rangers (1) | 1–0 | Derby County | Wigan Athletic; Brighton & Hove Albion | |
| 2015 | Wembley Stadium | Norwich City (1) | 2–0 | Middlesbrough | Brentford; Ipswich Town | |
| 2016 | Wembley Stadium | Hull City (2) | 1–0 | Sheffield Wednesday | Brighton & Hove Albion; Derby County | |
| 2017 | Wembley Stadium | Huddersfield Town (1) | 0–0 ‡ (Note: Huddersfield Town won the 2017 EFL Championship play-off final with a 4–3 penalty shoot-out victory over Reading.) | Reading | Sheffield Wednesday; Fulham | |
| 2018 | Wembley Stadium | Fulham (1) | 1–0 | Aston Villa | Derby County; Middlesbrough | |
| 2019 | Wembley Stadium | Aston Villa (1) | 2–1 | Derby County | West Bromwich Albion; Leeds United | |
| 2020 | Wembley Stadium | Fulham (2) | 2–1 † | Brentford | Cardiff City; Swansea City | |
| 2021 | Wembley Stadium | Brentford (1) | 2–0 | Swansea City | Bournemouth; Barnsley | |
| 2022 | Wembley Stadium | Nottingham Forest (1) | 1–0 | Huddersfield Town | Luton Town; Sheffield United | |
| 2023 | Wembley Stadium | Luton Town (1) | 1–1 ‡ (Note: Luton Town won the 2023 EFL Championship play-off final with a 6–5 penalty shoot-out victory over Coventry City.) | Coventry City | Sunderland; Middlesbrough | |
| 2024 | Wembley Stadium | Southampton (1) | 1–0 | Leeds United | West Bromwich Albion; Norwich City | |
| 2025 | Wembley Stadium | Sunderland (1) | 2–1 | Sheffield United | Coventry City; Bristol City | |
| 2026 | Wembley Stadium | Hull City (3) | 1–0 | Middlesbrough | Millwall; Southampton | |

== Statistics ==
Crystal Palace have secured promotion to the top tier of English football through the play-offs more times than any other club, having won four finals. Hull City has won the second-tier play-offs on three occasions, while Fulham, West Ham United, Watford, Bolton Wanderers, and Swindon Town have each won twice (although Swindon have only won promotion through the play-offs once, as promotion was withdrawn following their first play-off victory due to financial irregularities). Sheffield United have lost four times in the Championship play-off finals. Ipswich Town have participated in the Championship play-offs a joint-record eight times: 1987, 1997–2000 inclusive, 2004, 2005 and 2015, making the final only once in 2000 when they won promotion with a 4–2 victory over Barnsley. Derby County have also qualified for the play-offs eight times, with their only promotion coming following a win over West Bromwich Albion in the 2007 final. Leicester City have reached the Championship play-off final four times (in the space of five seasons), losing two in 1992 and 1993 and winning two in 1994 and 1996.
