= 1978–79 Football League Cup =

Tournament details
- Country: England; Wales
- Teams: 92

Final positions
- Champions: Nottingham Forest
- Runners-up: Southampton

Tournament statistics
- Top goal scorer(s): Garry Birtles; Bob Latchford (6 goals)

The 1978–79 Football League Cup was the 19th season of the Football League Cup, a knockout competition for England's top 92 football clubs. The competition started on 12 August 1978 and ended with the final on 17 March 1979.

The final was contested by First Division teams Nottingham Forest and Southampton at Wembley Stadium in London.

== First round ==
=== First leg ===
Home team	Score	Away team	Date
Aldershot	0–1	Millwall	12 August 1978
Barnsley	1–2	Chesterfield	12 August 1978
Bournemouth	0–1	Exeter City	12 August 1978
Bradford City	2–0	Lincoln City	12 August 1978
Bristol Rovers	2–1	Hereford United	12 August 1978
Cambridge United	2–2	Northampton Town	12 August 1978
Cardiff City	1–2	Oxford United	12 August 1978
Carlisle United	2–2	Blackpool	12 August 1978
Colchester United	2–3	Charlton Athletic	12 August 1978
Crewe Alexandra	1–0	Rochdale	12 August 1978
Doncaster Rovers	0–1	Sheffield Wednesday	12 August 1978
Grimsby Town	2–0	York City	12 August 1978
Hull City	0–1	Peterborough United	12 August 1978
Mansfield Town	0–1	Darlington	12 August 1978
Newport County	2–1	Swansea City	12 August 1978
Plymouth Argyle	1–1	Torquay United	12 August 1978
Port Vale	0–3	Chester	12 August 1978
Portsmouth	0–0	Swindon Town	12 August 1978
Preston North End	3–0	Huddersfield Town	12 August 1978
Reading	3–1	Gillingham	12 August 1978
Rotherham United	5–0	Hartlepool United	12 August 1978
Scunthorpe United	0–1	Notts County	12 August 1978
Shrewsbury Town	1–0	Stockport County	14 August 1978
Southend United	1–0	Wimbledon	12 August 1978
Tranmere Rovers	1–1	Wigan Athletic	12 August 1978
Walsall	2–1	Halifax Town	12 August 1978
Watford	4–0	Brentford	12 August 1978
Wrexham	2–0	Bury	12 August 1978

=== Second leg ===
Home team	Score	Away team	Date	Agg
Blackpool	2–1	Carlisle United	16 August 1978	4–3
Brentford	1–3	Watford	15 August 1978	1–7
Bury	1–2	Wrexham	15 August 1978	1–4
Charlton Athletic	0–0	Colchester United	15 August 1978	3–2
Chester	1–1	Port Vale	16 August 1978	4–1
Chesterfield	0–0	Barnsley	16 August 1978	2–1
Darlington	2–2	Mansfield Town	15 August 1978	3–2
Exeter City	1–1	Bournemouth	15 August 1978	2–1
Gillingham	1–2	Reading	15 August 1978	2–5
Halifax Town	0–2	Walsall	15 August 1978	1–4
Hartlepool United	1–1	Rotherham United	15 August 1978	1–6
Hereford United	4–0	Bristol Rovers	16 August 1978	5–2
Huddersfield Town	2–2	Preston North End	15 August 1978	2–5
Lincoln City	1–1	Bradford City	16 August 1978	1–3
Millwall	1–0	Aldershot	16 August 1978	2–0
Northampton Town	2–1	Cambridge United	16 August 1978	4–3
Notts County	3–0	Scunthorpe United	15 August 1978	4–0
Oxford United	2–1	Cardiff City	16 August 1978	4–2
Peterborough United	1–2	Hull City	15 August 1978	2–2
Rochdale	2–4	Crewe Alexandra	14 August 1978	2–5
Sheffield Wednesday	0–1	Doncaster Rovers	15 August 1978	1–1
Stockport County	3–1	Shrewsbury Town	16 August 1978	3–2
Swansea City	5–0	Newport County	15 August 1978	6–2
Swindon Town	4–2	Portsmouth	15 August 1978	4–2
Torquay United	1–2	Plymouth Argyle	16 August 1978	2–3
Wigan Athletic	2–1	Tranmere Rovers	16 August 1978	3–2
Wimbledon	4–1	Southend United	15 August 1978	4–2
York City	0–3	Grimsby Town	15 August 1978	0–5

=== Replays ===
Home team	Score	Away team	Date
Doncaster Rovers	0–1	Sheffield Wednesday	22 August 1978
Hull City	0–1	Peterborough United	22 August 1978

== Second round ==
Home team	Score	Away team	Date
Aston Villa (1)	1–0	Sheffield Wednesday (3)	30 August 1978
Birmingham City (1)	2–5	Southampton (1)	29 August 1978
Blackpool (3)	2–0	Ipswich Town (1)	30 August 1978
Bolton Wanderers (1)	2–1	Chelsea (1)	29 August 1978
Brighton & Hove Albion (2)	1–0	Millwall (2)	29 August 1978
Bristol City (1)	1–2	Crystal Palace (2)	29 August 1978
Burnley (2)	1–1	Bradford City (4)	29 August 1978
Chester (3)	2–1	Coventry City (1)	30 August 1978
Crewe Alexandra (4)	2–0	Notts County (2)	30 August 1978
Everton (1)	8–0	Wimbledon (4)	29 August 1978
Exeter City (3)	2–1	Blackburn Rovers (2)	29 August 1978
Fulham (2)	2–2	Darlington (4)	29 August 1978
Leicester City (2)	0–1	Derby County (1)	30 August 1978
Orient (2)	1–2	Chesterfield (3)	29 August 1978
Luton Town (2)	2–0	Wigan Athletic (4)	29 August 1978
Manchester City (1)	2–0	Grimsby Town (4)	29 August 1978
Manchester United (1)	3–2	Stockport County (4)	30 August 1978
Middlesbrough (1)	0–0	Peterborough United (3)	29 August 1978
Northampton Town (4)	0–0	Hereford United (4)	29 August 1978
Oldham Athletic (2)	0–0	Nottingham Forest (1)	29 August 1978
Oxford United (3)	1–1	Plymouth Argyle (3)	30 August 1978
Preston North End (2)	1–3	Queens Park Rangers (1)	29 August 1978
Reading (4)	1–0	Wolverhampton Wanderers (1)	30 August 1978
Rotherham United (3)	3–1	Arsenal (1)	29 August 1978
Sheffield United (2)	1–0	Liverpool (1)	28 August 1978
Sunderland (2)	0–2	Stoke City (2)	30 August 1978
Swansea City (3)	2–2	Tottenham Hotspur (1)	29 August 1978
Walsall (3)	1–2	Charlton Athletic (2)	29 August 1978
Watford (3)	2–1	Newcastle United (2)	29 August 1978
West Bromwich Albion (1)	0–0	Leeds United (1)	29 August 1978
West Ham United (2)	1–2	Swindon Town (3)	30 August 1978
Wrexham (2)	1–3	Norwich City (1)	29 August 1978

=== Replays ===
Home team	Score	Away team	Date
Bradford City	2–3	Burnley	5 September 1978
Darlington	1–0	Fulham	5 September 1978
Hereford United	0–1	Northampton Town	6 September 1978
Leeds United	0–0	West Bromwich Albion	6 September 1978
Nottingham Forest	4–2	Oldham Athletic	6 September 1978
Peterborough United	1–0	Middlesbrough	5 September 1978
Plymouth Argyle	1–2	Oxford United	5 September 1978
Tottenham Hotspur	1–3	Swansea City	6 September 1978

=== 2nd Replay ===
Home team	Score	Away team	Date
West Bromwich Albion	0–1	Leeds United	2 October 1978

== Third round ==
Home team	Score	Away team	Date
Aston Villa	1–1	Crystal Palace	4 October 1978
Blackpool	1–1	Manchester City	4 October 1978
Burnley	1–3	Brighton & Hove Albion	3 October 1978
Chester	0–2	Norwich City	4 October 1978
Chesterfield	4–5	Charlton Athletic	4 October 1978
Everton	1–0	Darlington	3 October 1978
Exeter City	2–1	Bolton Wanderers	4 October 1978
Luton Town	2–1	Crewe Alexandra	3 October 1978
Manchester United	1–2	Watford	4 October 1978
Northampton Town	1–3	Stoke City	3 October 1978
Oxford United	0–5	Nottingham Forest	4 October 1978
Peterborough United	1–1	Swindon Town	3 October 1978
Queens Park Rangers	2–0	Swansea City	3 October 1978
Rotherham United	2–2	Reading	3 October 1978
Sheffield United	1–4	Leeds United	10 October 1978
Southampton	1–0	Derby County	3 October 1978

=== Replays ===
Home team	Score	Away team	Date
Crystal Palace	0–0	Aston Villa	10 October 1978
Manchester City	3–0	Blackpool	10 October 1978
Reading	1–0	Rotherham United	10 October 1978
Swindon Town	0–2	Peterborough United	10 October 1978

=== 2nd Replay ===
Home team	Score	Away team	Date
Aston Villa	3–0	Crystal Palace	16 October 1978

== Fourth round ==
Home team	Score	Away team	Date
Aston Villa	0–2	Luton Town	8 November 1978
Brighton & Hove Albion	1–0	Peterborough United	7 November 1978
Charlton Athletic	2–3	Stoke City	7 November 1978
Everton	2–3	Nottingham Forest	7 November 1978
Exeter City	0–2	Watford	8 November 1978
Norwich City	1–3	Manchester City	8 November 1978
Queens Park Rangers	0–2	Leeds United	7 November 1978
Reading	0–0	Southampton	8 November 1978

=== Replay ===
Home team	Score	Away team	Date
Southampton	2–0	Reading	14 November 1978

== Fifth Round ==
Home team	Score	Away team	Date
Leeds United	4–1	Luton Town	13 December 1978
Nottingham Forest	3–1	Brighton & Hove Albion	13 December 1978
Southampton	2–1	Manchester City	12 December 1978
Stoke City	0–0	Watford	13 December 1978

=== Replay ===
Home team	Score	Away team	Date
Watford	3–1	Stoke City	9 January 1979

== Semi-finals ==
=== First leg ===
Home team	Score	Away team	Date
Leeds United	2–2	Southampton	24 January 1979
Nottingham Forest	3–1	Watford	17 January 1979

=== Second leg ===
Home team	Score	Away team	Date	Agg
Southampton	1–0	Leeds United	30 January 1979	3–2
Watford	0–0	Nottingham Forest	30 January 1979	1–3

== Final ==
=== Match details ===
Nottingham Forest	Southampton

Nottingham Forest; Red shirts/White shorts/Red socks	3 — 2 (final score after 90 minutes)	Southampton; Yellow shirts/Blue shorts/Yellow socks
Manager: Brian Clough Team: 1 Peter Shilton (GK); 2 Colin Barrett; 3 Frank Clark; 4 John McGovern (c); 5 Larry Lloyd; 6 David Needham; 7 Martin O'Neill; 8 Archie Gemmill; 9 Garry Birtles; 10 Tony Woodcock; 11 John Robertson; 12 Ian Bowyer Scorers: Garry Birtles 51', 79'; Tony Woodcock 83'	Half-time: 0–1 Competition: Football League Cup (Final) Date: 15.00 GMT Saturday 17 March 1979 Venue: Wembley Stadium, London Attendance: 96,952 Referee: Peter Reeves Match rules: 90 minutes. 30 minutes extra-time if necessary. Match replayed if scores still level. One named substitute.	Manager: Lawrie McMenemy Team: 1 Terry Gennoe (GK); 2 Ivan Golac; 3 David Peach; 4 Steve Williams; 5 Chris Nicholl; 6 Malcolm Waldron; 7 Alan Ball (c); 8 Phil Boyer; 9 Austin Hayes (substituted off) 83'; 10 Nick Holmes; 11 Terry Curran; 12 Tony Sealy (substituted on) 83' Scorers: David Peach 16'; Nick Holmes 88'
