= Terry Gennoe =

English footballer

Personal information
- Full name: Terence William Gennoe
- Date of birth: 16 March 1953 (age 73)
- Place of birth: Shrewsbury, England
- Height: 6 ft 2 in (1.88 m)
- Position: Goalkeeper

Senior career*
Years	Team	Apps	(Gls)
1972–1974	Bury	3	(0)
1975–1978	Halifax Town	78	(0)
1978–1980	Southampton	36	(0)
1980–1981	→ Crystal Palace (loan)	3	(0)
1981–1991	Blackburn Rovers	289	(0)
Total		409	(0)
- * Club domestic league appearances and goals

Terence William Gennoe (born 16 March 1953) is an English former professional footballer who played as a goalkeeper. He made more than 400 appearances in the Football League for Bury, Halifax Town, Southampton and on loan at Crystal Palace, before spending a decade at Blackburn Rovers, from 1981 until 1991.

He then went into coaching, and was Blackburn Rovers' goalkeeping coach before joining Newcastle United (for two spells), Celtic and Aston Villa.

== Club career ==
=== Early career ===
Gennoe was rejected by West Bromwich Albion and Manchester United, but he continued to play for Sunday League side Bricklayers Arms whilst at teacher training college. He was spotted by a scout from Bury and offered a part-time contract. In 1975, Halifax Town signed Gennoe for £3,000.

=== Southampton ===
Despite being close to signing for Watford, Gennoe joined Southampton for £35,000 after Halifax manager Alan Ball Sr alerted his son's club. He played against Nottingham Forest in the 1979 League Cup final. Two days after the final, Southampton played Arsenal in the sixth round of the FA Cup with an unchanged squad, but manager Lawrie McMenemy believed Gennoe was at fault for Arsenal's equaliser. Following this, he lost his place to Peter Wells and, with the arrival of Ivan Katalinic, he became third choice. He had a short spell on loan at Crystal Palace. Gennoe made 51 appearances in all competitions for Southampton.

=== Blackburn Rovers ===
In August 1981, he moved to Blackburn Rovers. He made 289 league appearances in his decade at the club and still holds the club record for the most league appearances by a Rovers goalkeeper. Brad Friedel left Blackburn after eight seasons in 2008, having made 287 league appearances, just two matches short of Gennoe's club record.

== Coaching career ==
Gennoe retired from playing in 1991 but continued as a goalkeeping coach at Ewood Park. Gennoe's 16-year stint at Ewood Park ended over a contract dispute in 1997 but he was soon back working for Kenny Dalglish and Shay Given at St James' Park. Gennoe left Tyneside in 1999 to take up a similar post at Celtic, where he remained until 2005.

On 4 July 2006, Gennoe returned to Tyneside for a second spell. In October 2007, he was forced to leave Newcastle due to a long-standing back injury.

In September 2011, Gennoe returned after three seasons out of the game to be the new first team goalkeeping coach at Villa Park, replacing Rafa Gonzalez. Gennoe was reunited with Shay Given, who he had previously coached at Rovers and the Magpies, with Gennoe also coaching Brad Guzan and Andy Marshall at the Birmingham club. Gennoe left the Midlands club in March 2016, after the club manager, Remi Garde departed, with Gennoe being replaced by Gary Walsh.

== Honours ==
=== As a player ===
Southampton

- Football League Cup runner-up: 1978–79
