= Lymington Town F.C. =

English football club

Coordinates: 50°45′33″N 1°32′53″W

Lymington Town
- Full name: Lymington Town Football Club
- Nicknames: Town, The Linnets
- Founded: 1876
- Ground: The Sports Ground, Lymington
- Chairman: Rebecca Wildman
- Manager: Craig Stanley
- League: Wessex League Division One
- 2025–26: Wessex League Division One, 14th of 22
Home colours	Away colours

Lymington Town Football Club is a football club based in the coastal town of Lymington, Hampshire, England. Known as "The Linnets", they are currently members of the Wessex League Division One and play at the Sports Ground.

== History ==
The club was established in 1876 as Lymington Football Club. They entered the Hampshire League in 1903, joining the West Division, but left at the end of the 1903–04 season. The club rejoined the West Division in 1910, but left after finishing bottom of the division in their first season, losing all but one of their games. They returned to the West Section of the league in 1920, before being moved into the Division Section for the 1921–22 season. In 1922–23 the club played in both the East and West sections, winning the East Section title. They were members of both sections again the following season, before playing in only the West Section in 1924–25.

Lymington were West Section runners-up in 1925–26 and went on to win the division the following season, earning promotion to the County Section. They were placed in the South Division for the 1928–29 season amidst league reorganisation, before becoming members of Division One the next season. In 1953–54 the club finished bottom of Division One and were relegated to Division Two, and were subsequently relegated to Division Three at the end of the 1956–57 season, having finished bottom of Division Two. However, they were Division Three runners-up the following season and were promoted back to Division Two.

The 1961–62 season saw Lymington finish bottom of Division Two, resulting in another relegation to Division Three. They won the Division Three title in 1967–68, earning promotion back to Division Two. However, the club finished second-from-bottom of Division Two in 1970–71 and were relegated to Division Three again. In 1977–78 they finished bottom of Division Three, but were not relegated to Division Four; this was repeated in the 1979–80 season. The club were Division Three runners-up in 1982–83 and were promoted to Division Two. They went on to finish as Division Two runners-up the following season, resulting in promotion to the Premier Division.

In 1986 Lymington were founder members of the new Wessex League. After finishing bottom of the league in 1987–88 they merged with Wellworthy Athletic to form AFC Lymington. However, when AFC Lymington merged with New Milton Town in 1998 to form Lymington & New Milton with the new club based in New Milton, the Lymington club was re-established under the name Lymington Town. They were accepted into Division Three of the Hampshire League and went on to finished third in the 1998–99 season, earning promotion into the Premier Division.

In 2004 the Hampshire League merged into the Wessex League, with Lymington becoming members of the new Division Two. They won the division at the first attempt and were promoted to Division One, which was renamed the Premier Division the following season. In 2006–07 the club won the League Cup. Following the 2020–21 season, which was curtailed due to the COVID-19 pandemic, they were promoted to Division One South of the Southern League. However, they were demoted back to the Premier Division of the Wessex League at the end of the 2022–23 season after failing to meet ground grading requirements. They went on to finish bottom of the Premier Division in 2023–24 and were relegated to Division One.

== Ground ==
The club have played at the Sports Ground since their establishment. A pavilion was opened in 1913 and a wooden grandstand built in 1929. The pavilion was burnt down in 1968. Floodlights were erected in 1981, and in 1989 a new stand with bench seating replaced the wooden grandstand.

== Honours ==
- Wessex League
  - Division Two champions 2004–05
  - League Cup winners 2006–07
- Hampshire League
  - East Section champions 1922–23
  - West Section champions 1926–27
  - Division Three champions 1967–68

== Records ==
- Best FA Cup performance: Fourth qualifying round, 1951–52
- Best FA Vase performance: Fourth round, 2007–08

== See also ==
- Lymington Town F.C. players
- Lymington Town F.C. managers
