= New Milton F.C. (1898) =

New Milton
- Full name: New Milton Football Club
- Founded: 1897
- Dissolved: 1998
- Ground: Fawcett Fields, New Milton
Home colours	Away colours

New Milton F.C. were a long running amateur football club based in New Milton, a market town in the New Forest district of Hampshire.

They ran for 101 years, and were long standing members of the original Hampshire League until 1998, when they merged with AFC Lymington to form Lymington & New Milton.

== History ==
New Milton were formed in 1897 and spent their formative years playing friendly fixtures before joining the New Forest League. For many years the team were based at the Recreation Ground, close to the town centre.

In 1924, New Milton were elected to the Hampshire League West Division and by the end of the decade had progressed to Division 1. At the time, the competition was of a very high standard, and they did superbly well to finish 4th in 1931, their highest ever final position. During this time, they also began entering national cup competitions. However, financial problems forced them to leave in 1936 for the less demanding Bournemouth League.

After World War II, the club reformed (as New Milton Argyle until 1950) and returned to the county league in 1946. They very much became main-stays in the third tier, as apart from two seasons in Division 2 (1972-74), they would remain here for the next 40 years.

Following the creation of the Wessex League in 1986, the Hampshire League was consequently restructured, and New Milton were placed in a revised Division 2. Again, they consolidated and after a series of encouraging seasons they won the Bournemouth Senior Cup and were promoted in 1992.

A year later, the club became known as New Milton Town after accepting an offer from the local council to use the newly opened sports ground at Fawcett Fields. Here they had the main enclosed pitch with impressive facilities that would enable them to progress to a higher level. There was initial success when they reached the 1996 League Cup final, but then surprisingly lost 0-1 against lower division Otterbourne. After this the club found it difficult to attract quality players and were relegated the following year.

In 1998 New Milton merged with ambitious neighbours AFC Lymington to form Lymington & New Milton, taking the 'Linnets' place in the Wessex League and playing at Fawcett Fields.

However, the move was not universally popular amongst both sets of supporters. Lymington Town was immediately reformed, whilst the previous New Milton first team continued for the following season before disbanding. The name of the merged club was later changed back to New Milton Town.

== Honours ==
- Bournemouth Football Association
  - Senior Cup Winners 1990/91
  - Junior Cup Winners
- Hampshire League
  - League Cup Finalists 1995/96
- Bournemouth League
  - Division 1 Champions
  - Division 2 Champions
- New Forest League
  - Division 1 Champions
  - Division 2 Champions

== Playing Records ==
=== Hampshire League ===
Season	Division	Position	Significant events
1924/25	West Division	11/13	
1925/26	West Division	3/12	
1926/27	West Division	6/10	
1927/28	West Division	6/12	Re-organisation
1928/29	South Division	9/13	Re-organisation
1929/30	Division 1	15/16	
1930/31	Division 1	4/16	Highest ever position
1931/32	Division 1	10/16	
1932/33	Division 1	15/15	
1933/34	Division 1	16/16	Relegated
1934/35	Division 2	4/16	Promoted
1935/36	Division 1	16/16	Relegated - left competition
1936-46			
1945/46	Division 3	7/12	
1946/47	Division 3 West	9/12	
1947/48	Division 3 West	9/14	
1948/49	Division 3 West	9/14	
1949/50	Division 3 West	9/14	
1950/51	Division 3 West	7/14	
1951/52	Division 3 West	13/14	
1952/53	Division 3 West	11/14	
1953/54	Division 3 West	14/14	
1954/55	Division 3 West	10/11	
1955/56	Division 3	12/16	
1956/57	Division 3	11/16	
1957/58	Division 3	14/16	
1958/59	Division 3	12/16	
1959/60	Division 3	12/16	
1960/61	Division 3	6/16	
1961/62	Division 3	13/16	
1962/63	Division 3	6/16	
1963/64	Division 3	11/16	
1964/65	Division 3	12/16	
1965/66	Division 3	16/16	
1966/67	Division 3	8/16	
1967/68	Division 3	15/16	
1968/69	Division 3 West	10/14	
1969/70	Division 3 West	11/16	
1970/71	Division 3 West	11/16	
1971/72	Division 3	4/16	Promoted
1972/73	Division 2	12/16	
1973/74	Division 2	15/16	Relegated
1974/75	Division 3	4/16	
1975/76	Division 3	4/16	
1976/77	Division 3	4/16	
1977/78	Division 3	15/16	
1978/79	Division 3	13/16	
1979/80	Division 3	11/15	
1980/81	Division 3	10/18	
1981/82	Division 3	10/16	
1982/83	Division 3	5/15	
1983/84	Division 3	11/18	
1984/85	Division 3	16/18	
1985/86	Division 3	13/18	
1986/87	Division 2	9/18	Re-organisation due to creation of Wessex League
1987/88	Division 2	8/19	
1988/89	Division 2	12/19	
1989/90	Division 2	5/18	
1990/91	Division 2	6/18	
1991/92	Division 2	3/15	Promoted
1992/93	Division 1	8/17	
1993/94	Division 1	15/20	
1994/95	Division 1	14/20	
1995/96	Division 1	16/20	
1996/97	Division 1	19/21	Relegated
1997/98	Division 2	15/18	Merged with AFC Lymington

=== FA Cup ===
Season	Round	Opponents	Result
1929/30	Extra-Preliminary Round	H v Castle Hill	L 0-3
1931/32	Extra-Preliminary Round	A v Fareham	L 0-3
1932/33	Preliminary Round	H v Bournemouth	L 2-7

== Notable Players ==
New Milton had many fine players over the years, including former professionals Bill Rawlings, George Harkus, Bill Kitchener and Neil Prosser.

== Ground ==
Until 1993, New Milton played on the Recreation Ground in the town centre.

They then relocated to the newly opened and better equipped Fawcett Fields, Christchurch Road, New Milton, Hampshire. BH25 6QB. The ground remains is use today. It has a large pavilion and is enclosed with a large stand, permanent pitch barrier and floodlights.

The 'phoenix side' played the 1998/99 season at near-by Milford-on-Sea.

== Local rivalries ==
New Milton enjoyed a healthy rivalry with number of New Forest clubs such as Brockenhurst, Sway, Bashley, Ringwood Town, Wellworthy Athletic and Lymington Town.

== Successor club ==
- See New Milton Town F.C.
