= List of miscellaneous works by Edward Blore =

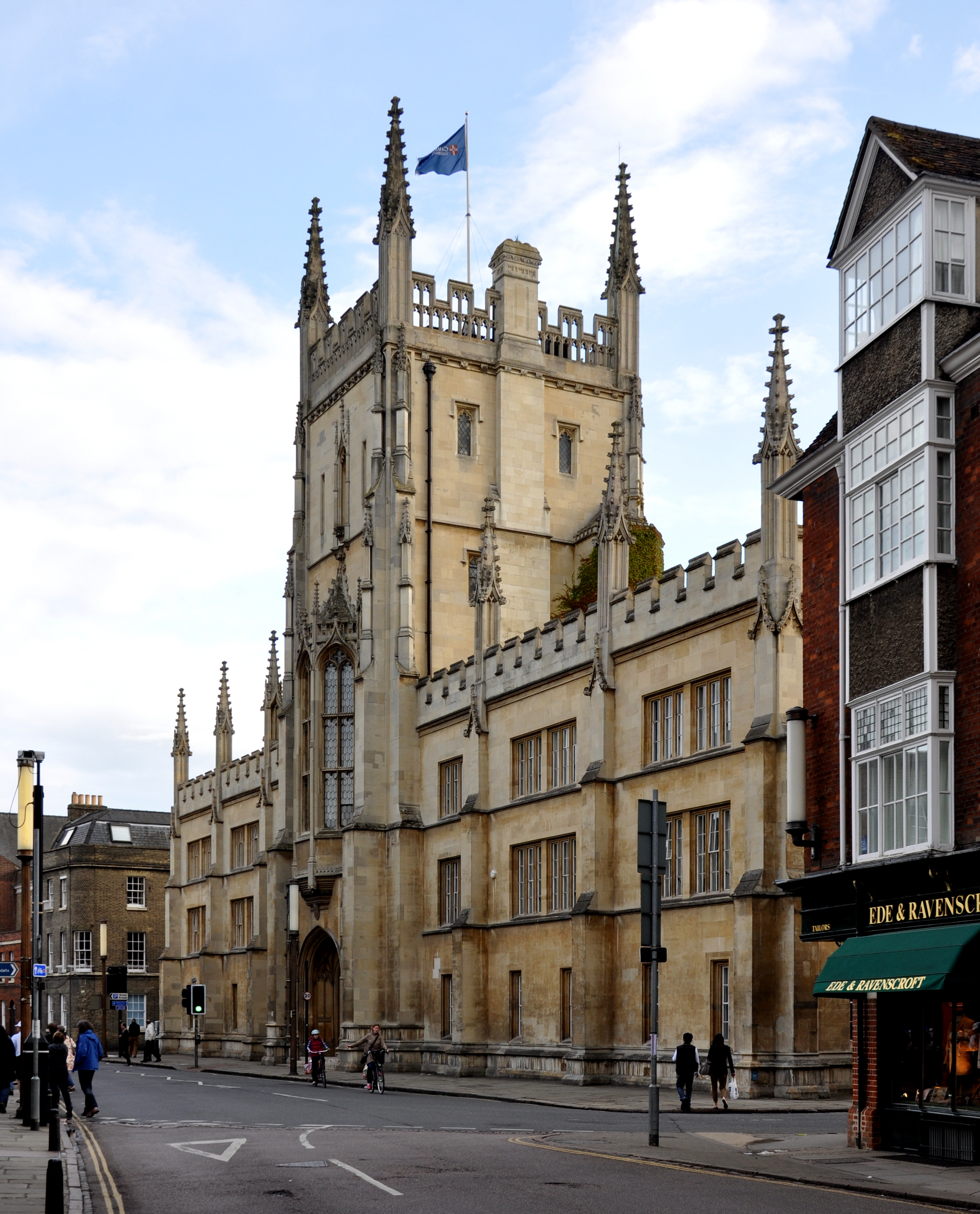
Pitt Building, Cambridge

Edward Blore (1787–1879) was an English antiquarian, artist, and architect. He was born in Derby, and was trained by his father, Thomas, who was an antiquarian and a topographer. Edward became skilled at drawing accurate and detailed architectural illustrations. His commissions included drawings of Peterborough, Durham, and Winchester Cathedrals. His drawings of Althorp brought him to the attention of Earl Spencer, who was influential in introducing him to other wealthy and influential patrons. After his father died in 1818, Blore started to prepare architectural designs for new buildings. The first of these was for the enlargement of Sir Walter Scott's Abbotsford House. Although this was not accepted, it led to the acceptance of his design for Corehouse, a large country house in Lanarkshire, Scotland, for the judge George Cranstoun. More commissions for country houses followed. Blore then became involved with the Church Commissioners, designing, with others, a series of churches that have become to be known as Commissioners' churches, the first of these being St George's Church in Battersea, London.

Blore's connection with Earl Spencer helped him to gain the commission for rebuilding Lambeth Palace for the Archbishop of Canterbury. Following this he worked on some of the most important buildings in the country, including the completion of Buckingham Palace, on Windsor Castle and on Hampton Court Palace. He gained two commissions for major works abroad, the Vorontsov Palace in Ukraine, and Government House in Sydney, Australia. The rest of his works are in Great Britain, and mainly in England. These range from palaces and country houses, cathedrals and churches, through schools, rectories, and lodges, to groups of estate houses with washhouses.

Blore received a DCL degree from Oxford University, and was a founder member of the British Archaeological Association and of the Institute of British Architects. He retired from active architectural practice in 1849, but continued to produce drawings. In total, these filled 48 volumes, which are held in the British Library. Blore died at his home in Manchester Square, Marylebone, London, in 1879, leaving an estate of £80,000 (equivalent to £10,270,000 in 2023).

== Key ==
Grade	Criteria
Grade I	Buildings of exceptional interest, sometimes considered to be internationally important.
Grade II*	Particularly important buildings of more than special interest.
Grade II	Buildings of national importance and special interest.
"—" denotes a work that is not graded.

== Works ==
Name	Location	Photograph	Date	Notes	Grade
Green Meadow	Great Brington, Northamptonshire; 52.2805°N 1.0235°W		c. 1822	Designed as a rectory.	II
Stable and coach house, Weston House	Long Compton, Warwickshire; 52.0191°N 1.5946°W		1826–33	To serve the former Weston House; for Sir George Philips.	II
Almhouses	Charterhouse Square, Islington, Greater London; 51.5220°N 0.1008°W		1826–40	Part of Sutton's Hospital.	II
Magdalene Hospital	Wilton, Wiltshire; 51.0823°N 1.8566°W		1828–32	Designed as almshouses for Lady Pembroke.	II
Town Hall	Woburn, Bedfordshire; 51.9885°N 0.6195°W		1830	Built for John Russell, 6th Duke of Bedford.	II
Fir Tree Cottage	Aspley Heath, Bedfordshire; 52.0076°N 0.6450°W		c. 1830	Estate cottage for the 6th Duke of Bedford.	II
Clock House	Keele Hall, Staffordshire; 52.9996°N 2.2725°W		c. 1830	Built as a stable block and coach house for Ralph Sneyd (1793–1870). Now part of the campus of Keele University.	II
Lodge, Stowe House	Stowe, Buckinghamshire; 52.0314°N 1.0204°W		c. 1830	Small lodge to the northwest of the mansion house.	II
Lower School	Woburn, Bedfordshire; 51.9898°N 0.6199°W		c. 1830	Reworking of a school built in 1582.	II
Pitt Building	Cambridge; 52.2020°N 0.1177°E		1831	A building for the Cambridge University Press.	II
Bedford Modern School	Bedford; 52.1361°N 0.4687°W		1831–34	Designed as a school; later the façade of a shopping centre.	II*
Holy Trinity Hospital	Retford, Nottinghamshire; 53.3232°N 0.9507°W		1832–34	Built as almshouses.	II
West Lodge and Gateway	Chillingham Castle, Northumberland; 55.5233°N 1.9124°W		1835	For the 5th Earl of Tankerville.	II
Library	St Edmund Hall, Oxford; 51.7536°N 1.2501°W		1835	Former church, later converted into a college library. Restored by Blore.	I
9–12 The Square	Chillingham, Northumberland; 55.5284°N 1.9076°W		1836	Estate houses for the 5th Earl of Tankerville.	II
Merton College	Oxford; 51.7513°N 1.2520°W		1836–41	Blore re-faced parts of the north range of the front quadrangle in Bath stone.	I
1–3 Bank Top	Chillingham, Northumberland; 55.5283°N 1.9120°W		1837	Built as estate houses for the 5th Earl of Tankerville.	II
Stable block	Combermere Park, Cheshire; 52.9939°N 2.6124°W	Stable block, Combermere Abbey	1837		II
Old Vicarage	Milton Abbot, Devon; 50.5907°N 4.2529°W		1837	Built as a vicarage, later divided into two properties.	II
Town Hall	Warminster, Wiltshire; 51.2048°N 2.1811°W		c. 1837		II
Stable and coach house, Ramsey Abbey	Ramsey, Cambridgeshire; 52.4493°N 0.1004°W		1837–39	For Edward Fellowes. Later converted for residential use.	II
4–8 Bank Top	Chillingham, Northumberland; 55.5286°N 1.9119°W		1838	Built as estate houses for the 5th Earl of Tankerville.	II
Literary and Scientific Institute	Warminster, Wiltshire; 51.2048°N 2.1811°W		1838		II
Bank Top Cottage	Chillingham, Northumberland; 55.5289°N 1.9118°W		1839	Built as an estate cottage for the 5th Earl of Tankerville.	II
Riding School, Royal Mews	Windsor Castle, Berkshire; 51.4817°N 0.6043°W		1839–48		II
Greenstreet Lodge	Bushley, Worcestershire; 51.9988°N 2.2124°W		c. 1840	Originated as a pair of cottages in the Pull Court estate.	II
Stables, Haveringland Hall	Haveringland, Norfolk; 52.7470°N 1.1889°E		c. 1840	For Edward Fellowes; partly converted into houses.	II
Archway	Windsor Castle, Berkshire; 51.4806°N 0.6045°W		c. 1840		II
Icehouse Tower, Great Moreton Hall	Moreton cum Alcumlow, Cheshire; 53.1324°N 2.2400°W		1841–43		II
West Lodge, Great Moreton Hall	Moreton cum Alcumlow, Cheshire; 53.1366°N 2.2535°W		c. 1841–43		II
Range of buildings, Royal Mews	Windsor Castle, Berkshire; 51.4825°N 0.6054°W		c. 1842		II
Royal Stables House, Royal Mews	Windsor Castle, Berkshire; 51.4820°N 0.6052°W		c. 1842		II
Southwest gate and lodge, Royal Mews	Windsor Castle, Berkshire; 51.4814°N 0.6054°W		c. 1842		II
Pavilion, Kingston Hall	Kingston on Soar, Nottinghamshire; 52.8458°N 1.2484°W		1842–46	For Lord Belper.	II
Stable block, Kingston Hall	Kingston on Soar, Nottinghamshire; 52.8463°N 1.2484°W		1842–46	For Lord Belper, later converted into houses.	II
Stable block, Castle Hill House	Filleigh, Devon; 51.0400°N 3.8956°W		1843	Stable block to the west of the house, later estate offices.	II*
North Lodge, Capesthorne Hall	Siddington, Cheshire; 53.2577°N 2.2351°W		c.1843	Gate lodge.	II
Garden Cottage	Thorganby, North Yorkshire; 53.8827°N 0.9381°W		c. 1844	House for Revd Joseph Donnington Jefferson.	II
Lodge, Thicket Priory	Thorganby, North Yorkshire; 53.8829°N 0.9473°W		1844–47		II
A House, Marlborough College	Marlborough, Wiltshire; 51.4171°N 1.7370°W		1845–50		II
B House, Marlborough College	Marlborough, Wiltshire; 51.4175°N 1.7353°W		1845–50		II
Master's House, Marlborough College	Marlborough, Wiltshire; 51.4169°N 1.7346°W		1845–50		II
Group of ten houses and washhouses	Chapel Brampton, Northamptonshire; 52.2919°N 0.9336°W		1846		II
Merton Hall Shellhouse	Merton, Norfolk; 52.54307°N 0.81304°E		1846	A garden house in the grounds of Merton Hall.	II
North Lodge, Crewe Hall	Crewe Green, Cheshire; 53.0910°N 2.3968°W		1847	An estate lodge.	II
Group of ten houses and a washhouse	Church Brampton, Northamptonshire; 52.2855°N 0.9477°W		1848	Listed as three groups of houses and a washhouse.	II
Houses and a washhouse	Little Brington, Northamptonshire; 52.2677°N 1.0329°W		1848	Part of a planned development.	II
School	Ramsey, Cambridgeshire; 52.4491°N 0.1030°W		1848	Elementary school.	II
Group of ten houses and washhouses	Lower Harlestone, Northamptonshire; 52.2724°N 0.9631°W		1851		II
Tomb of General Forster Walker	Kensal Green Cemetery, Kensington and Chelsea, Greater London; 51.5290°N 0.2258°W		1866	Designed by Blore, carved by J. Forsyth.	II

== See also ==
- List of ecclesiastical works by Edward Blore
- List of works by Edward Blore on palaces and large houses
