= List of works by Edward Blore on palaces and large houses =

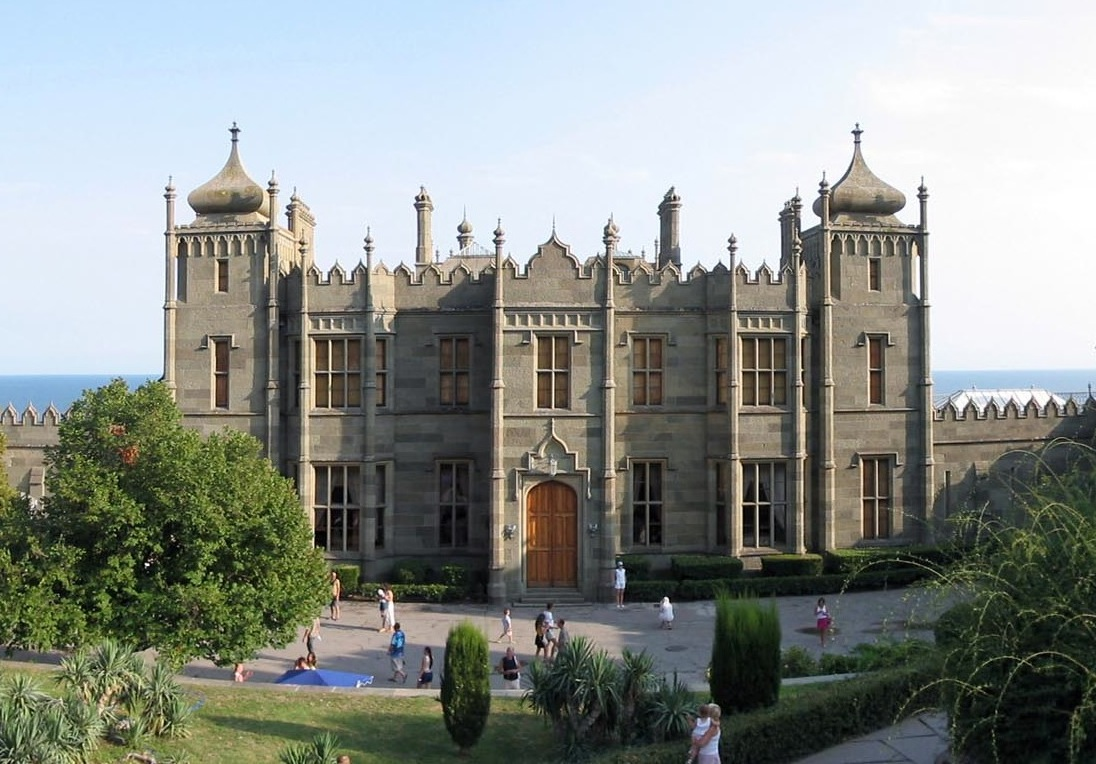
Vorontsov Palace, Alupka, Ukraine

Edward Blore (1787–1879) was an English antiquarian, artist, and architect. He was born in Derby, and was trained by his father, Thomas, who was an antiquarian and a topographer. Edward became skilled at drawing accurate and detailed architectural illustrations. His commissions included drawings of Peterborough, Durham, and Winchester Cathedrals. His drawings of Althorp brought him to the attention of Earl Spencer, who was influential in introducing him to other wealthy and influential patrons. After his father died in 1818, Blore started to prepare architectural designs for new buildings. The first of these was for the enlargement of Sir Walter Scott's Abbotsford House. Although this was not accepted, it led to the acceptance of his design for Corehouse, a large country house in Lanarkshire, Scotland, for the judge George Cranstoun. More commissions for country houses followed. Blore then became involved with the Church Commissioners, designing, with others, a series of churches that have become to be known as Commissioners' churches, the first of these being St George's Church in Battersea, London.

Blore's connection with Earl Spencer helped him to gain the commission for rebuilding Lambeth Palace for the Archbishop of Canterbury. Following this he worked on some of the most important buildings in the country, including the completion of Buckingham Palace, on Windsor Castle and on Hampton Court Palace. He gained two commissions for major works abroad, the Vorontsov Palace in Russia, and Government House, Sydney in Sydney, Australia. The rest of his works are in Great Britain, and mainly in England. These range from palaces and country houses, cathedrals and churches, through schools, rectories, and lodges, to groups of estate houses with washhouses.

Blore received a DCL degree from Oxford University, and was a founder member of the British Archaeological Association and of the Institute of British Architects. He retired from active architectural practice in 1849, but continued to produce drawings. In total, these filled 48 volumes, which are held in the British Library. Blore died at his home in Manchester Square, Marylebone, London, in 1879, leaving an estate of £80,000 (equivalent to £10,270,000 in 2023).

== Key ==
Grade	Criteria
Grade I	Buildings of exceptional interest, sometimes considered to be internationally important.
Grade II*	Particularly important buildings of more than special interest.
Grade II	Buildings of national importance and special interest.
"—" denotes a work that is not graded.
Category (Scotland)	Criteria
Category A	Buildings of special architectural or historical interest which are outstanding examples of a particular period, style or building type.
Category B	Buildings of special architectural or historic interest which are major examples of a particular period, style or building type.
Category C(S)	Buildings of special architectural or historic interest which are representative examples of a period, style or building type.
"—" denotes a work that is not graded.

== Works ==
Name	Location	Photograph	Date	Notes	Grade
Corehouse	Lanarkshire, Scotland; 55.6549°N 3.7778°W		1824–27	For George Cranstoun.	A
Canford House	Canford Magna, Dorset; 50.7897°N 1.9535°W		1825–36	Originally a country house replacing an earlier house, later a school. Built for William Ponsonby, 1st Baron de Mauley.	I
Weston House	Long Compton, Warwickshire		1826-33 (demolished 1934)	Built for Sir George Philips. Demolished 1934.	
Goodrich Court	Goodrich, Herefordshire		1828–31	For Samuel Rush Meyrick. Demolished 1950. The Monmouth Gatehouse, on the Monmouth to Ross-on-Wye road, is the only remaining element.	
Vorontsov Palace	Alupka, Crimea		1828–48	A place in the Crimea for Prince Mikhail Semyonovich Vorontsov.	
Lambeth Palace	Lambeth, Greater London; 51.4957°N 0.1200°W		1829–38	Rebuilt the residential wing for Rt Revd William Howley, Archbishop of Canterbury.	I
Hinchingbrooke House	Huntingdon, Cambridgeshire; 52.3276°N 0.2003°W		1830–	Restored and rebuilt after a fire.	I
Crom Castle	Crom near Newtownbutler County Fermanagh		1830-1838 1841	Built 1830-1838 for John Creighton(subsequently Crichton), the future, from 1842, Third Earl of Erne. Fire on 11 January 1841 burning down all but West Wing. Rebuilt to same Edward Blore designs by George Sudden (who also added water tanks in a yard).	
Bishop's Palace	Saint Asaph, Denbighshire, Wales; 53.257°N 3.4430°W		1830–31	West front enlarged for the Rt Revd William Carey, Bishop of St Asaph.	II*
Buckingham Palace	City of Westminster, Greater London; 51.5013°N 0.1420°W		1831–38; 1847–50	Completed the design of John Nash for William IV. Built the west front for Queen Victoria.	I
Isleworth House	Hounslow, Greater London; 51.4667°N 0.3237°W		1832	Name later changed to Nazareth House, and used as a nursing home.	II
Vale Royal Abbey	Whitegate, Cheshire; 53.2245°N 2.5426°W		1833	Added a southwest wing.	II*
Latimer House	Latimer, Buckinghamshire; 51.6793°N 0.5556°W		1834–38	A country house, later used as the National Defence College, and subsequently a conference centre.	II
Pull Court	Bushley, Worcestershire; 52.0231°N 2.2022°W		1834–39	A country house for Canon E. C. Dowdeswell.	II*
Capesthorne Hall	Siddington, Cheshire; 53.2517°N 2.2406°W		1837–39	Alterations for Edward Davies Davenport.	II*
Crewe Hall	Crewe Green, Cheshire; 53.0827°N 2.3999°W		1837–43	Restoration for Lord Crewe. Much damaged by fire in 1866. Blore also added a tower to the stable block.	I
Government House	Sydney, New South Wales, Australia		1837–45	Residence for the Governor of New South Wales.	
Merevale Hall	Merevale, Warwickshire; 52.5732°N 1.5655°W		1838–40	Rebuilt for Sir W. Dugdale.	II*
Hampton Court Palace	Richmond upon Thames, Greater London; 51.4033°N 0.3375°W		1838–48	Restoration.	I
Ramsey Abbey	Ramsey, Cambridgeshire; 52.4491°N 0.0993°W		1838–40	Alterations for Edward Fellowes. Blore also designed the garden terrace wall.	I
Haveringland Hall	Haveringland, Norfolk; 52.7479°N 1.1886°E		1839–43	For Edward Fellowes. Demolished in 1946.	
Shadwell Court	Brettenham, Norfolk; 52.4118°N 0.8343°E		1840–42	Rebuilt for Sir R. J. Buxton.	I
Worsley Hall	Worsley, Greater Manchester		1840–45	For Francis Egerton, 3rd Duke of Bridgewater. Demolished 1945–46.	
Windsor Castle	Windsor, Berkshire; 51.4842°N 0.6028°W		1840–47	Improved the royal apartments; reconstructed the Military Knight's lodgings.	I
Great Moreton Hall	Moreton cum Alcumlow, Cheshire; 53.1324°N 2.2414°W		1841–46	For G. H. Ackers, to replace an earlier building.	II*
Burford House, Royal Mews	Windsor Castle, Berkshire; 51.4816°N 0.6052°W		c. 1842	A house built in the late 17th century by the Duke of St Albans for Nell Gwynn; altered and re-cased by Blore.	II
Castle Hill	Filleigh, Devon; 51.0401°N 3.8968°W		1842–45	Extended for Lord Fortescue.	II*
Kingston Hall	Kingston on Soar, Nottinghamshire; 52.8462°N 1.2489°W		1843–45	A new house for Lord Belper.	II
Thicket Priory	Thorganby, North Yorkshire; 53.8835°N 0.9411°W		1844–47	A country house for Revd J.Dunnington-Jefferson. Later converted into a monastery.	II
The Frythe	Welwyn, Hertfordshire; 51.8201°N 0.2235°W		1845–46	A country house for William Wilshere.	
Merton Hall	Merton, Norfolk; 52.5440°N 0.8178°E		1846	A country house; only the northwest wing survives.	II
North Mymms House (or Place)	North Mymms, Hertfordshire; 51.7239°N 0.2384°W		1846–47	Alterations to a house dating from the late 16th century; for Fulke Greville.	I
The Grove	Sarratt, Hertfordshire; 51.6772°N 0.4365°W		c. 1870–75	Alterations and extensions to a country house dating from the late 16th century for the 4th Earl of Clarendon.	II*
Wiston House	Wiston, West Sussex; 50.8997°N 0.3589°W		Undated	A country house dating from about 1576, rebuilt and greatly enlarged by Blore in the early 19th century.	I

== See also ==
- List of ecclesiastical works by Edward Blore
- List of miscellaneous works by Edward Blore
