= List of ecclesiastical works by Edward Blore =

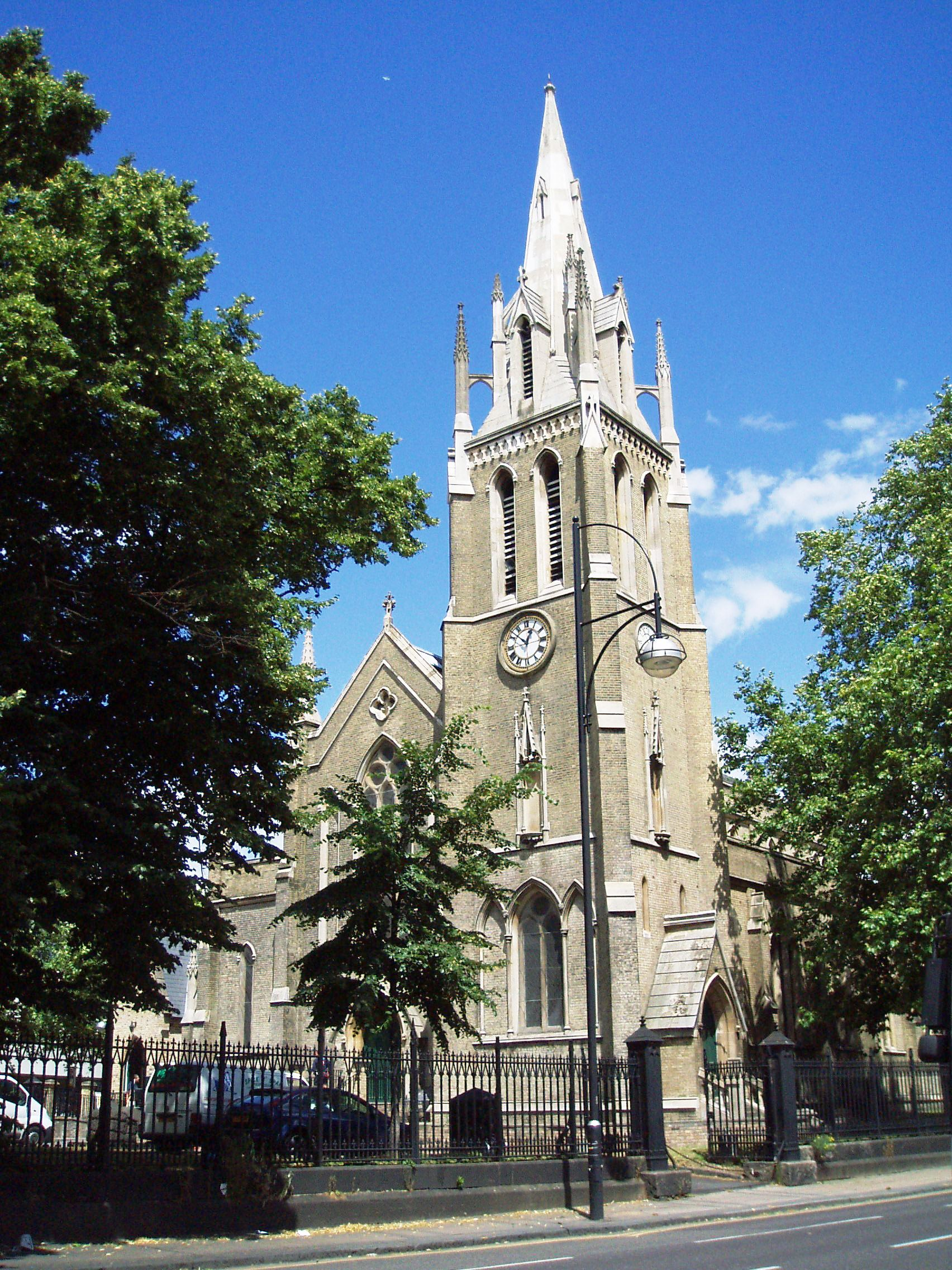
St John's Church, Stratford

Edward Blore (1787–1879) was an English antiquarian, artist, and architect. He was born in Derby, and was trained by his father, Thomas, who was an antiquarian and a topographer. Edward became skilled at drawing accurate and detailed architectural illustrations. His commissions included drawings of Peterborough, Durham, and Winchester Cathedrals. His drawings of Althorp brought him to the attention of Earl Spencer, who was influential in introducing him to other wealthy and influential patrons. After his father died in 1818, Blore started to prepare architectural designs for new buildings. The first of these was for the enlargement of Sir Walter Scott's Abbotsford House. Although this was not accepted, it led to the acceptance of his design for Corehouse, a large country house in Lanarkshire, Scotland, for the judge George Cranstoun. More commissions for country houses followed. Blore then became involved with the Church Commissioners, designing, with others, a series of churches that have become to be known as Commissioners' churches, the first of these being St George's Church in Battersea, London.

Blore's connection with Earl Spencer helped him to gain the commission for rebuilding Lambeth Palace for the Archbishop of Canterbury. Following this he worked on some of the most important buildings in the country, including the completion of Buckingham Palace, on Windsor Castle and on Hampton Court Palace. He gained two commissions for major works abroad, the Vorontsov Palace in Ukraine, and Government House, Sydney in Sydney, Australia. The rest of his works are in Great Britain, and mainly in England. These range from palaces and country houses, cathedrals and churches, through schools, rectories, and lodges, to groups of estate houses with washhouses.

Blore received a DCL degree from Oxford University, and was a founder member of the British Archaeological Association and of the Institute of British Architects. He retired from active architectural practice in 1849, but continued to produce drawings. In total, these filled 48 volumes, which are held in the British Library. Blore died at his home in Manchester Square, Marylebone, London, in 1879, leaving an estate of £80,000 (equivalent to £8,600,000 in 2025).

== Key ==
Grade	Criteria
Grade I	Buildings of exceptional interest, sometimes considered to be internationally important.
Grade II*	Particularly important buildings of more than special interest.
Grade II	Buildings of national importance and special interest.
"—" denotes a work that is not graded.
Category (Scotland)	Criteria
Category A	Buildings of special architectural or historical interest which are outstanding examples of a particular period, style or building type.
Category B	Buildings of special architectural or historic interest which are major examples of a particular period, style or building type.
Category C(S)	Buildings of special architectural or historic interest which are representative examples of a period, style or building type.
"—" denotes a work that is not graded.

== Works ==
Name	Location	Photograph	Date	Notes	Grade
St George's Church	Battersea, Greater London		1827–28	A Commissioners' Church, subsequently demolished.	
Westminster Abbey	Westminster, Greater London; 51.4994°N 0.1275°W		1827–49	As surveyor to the abbey, Blore rescued a 13th-century retable, installed a screen between the nave and the choir, remodelled the choir, and restored the cloister and the exterior of the north side of the nave.	I
Parish church	Canford Magna, Dorset; 50.7889°N 1.9560°W		1829	Nave extended towards the west.	I
St Paul's Church	Warrington, Cheshire		1829–30	A Commissioners' Church, subsequently demolished.	
Ripon Cathedral	Ripon, North Yorkshire; 54.1350°N 1.5202°W		1829–31	Restoration.	I
Old St Mary's Church	Woburn, Bedfordshire; 51.9896°N 0.6199°W		c. 1830	Blore carried out work on the tower. He also designed the wall, gates and gatepiers of the churchyard.	II
St Mary's Church	Longfleet, Poole, Dorset; 50.7227°N 1.9717°W		1830–33		II
Chapel, Trinity College	Cambridge; 52.2074°N 0.1174°E		1831–32	Restoration.	I
St John the Baptist's Church	Leytonstone, Waltham Forest, Greater London; 51.5687°N 0.0109°E		1831–32		II
Chapel, Wadham College	Oxford; 51.7561°N 1.2539°W		1831–32	Restoration.	I
Christ Church	Waltham Cross, Hertfordshire; 51.6922°N 0.0337°W		1831–32	A Commissioners' church. Originally dedicated to the Holy Trinity.	II
Christ Church	Croft, Cheshire; 53.4374°N 2.5433°W		1832–33	A Commissioners' church.	II
St John the Evangelist's Church	Stratford, Newham, Greater London; 51.5419°N 0.0030°E		1833–34	A Commissioners' church.	II
St John the Baptist's Church	Potters Bar, Hertfordshire; 51.6954°N 0.1762°W		1835	Damaged by fire in 1911; replaced by the new Church of St Mary the Virgin and All Saints.	
St Mary the Virgin's Church	Vincent Square, Westminster, Greater London; 51.4921°N 0.1340°W		1836–37	A Commissioners' church. Demolished in 1923.	
St Peter's Church	Stepney, Tower Hamlets, Greater London; 51.5242°N 0.0496°W		1837–38	Declared redundant in 1987 and converted into residential use.	II
Christ Church	Chelsea, Greater London; 51.48567°N 0.1639°W		1838	Built as a chapel of ease to St Luke, Chelsea.	II
Holy Trinity Church	Lambeth, Greater London		1838–39	A Commissioners' church. Damaged by bombing in about 1941.	
St Luke's Church	Berwick Street, Soho, Westminster, Greater London	—	1838–39	A Commissioners' church. Demolished in 1936.	
Chapel, Merton College	Oxford; 51.7511°N 1.2525°W		1838–43	Restoration.	I
Christ Church	Hoxton, Hackney, Greater London		1839	Damaged by bombing in 1944.	
Holy Trinity Church	Barkingside, Ilford, Redbridge, Greater London; 51.5895°N 0.0766°E		1839–40	A Commissioners' church.	II
Norwich Cathedral	Norwich, Norfolk; 52.6319°N 1.3007°E		c. 1840	Restoration/alterations.	I
Thorney Abbey	Thorney, Cambridgeshire; 52.6204°N 0.1071°W		1840–41	Alterations.	I
Ely Cathedral	Ely, Cambridgeshire; 52.3987°N 0.2638°E		1840–41, 1844	Restoration/alterations.	I
St Mary Magdalen's Church	Oxford; 51.7546°N 1.2588°W		1840–42	Rebuilt the south aisle.	I
Chapel, College of St Mark and St John	Kensington and Chelsea, Greater London; 51.4821°N 0.1867°W		1841	College chapel; designed in conjunction with its principal, Derwent Coleridge.	II
St Thomas' Church	Charterhouse Square, Smithfield, Greater London		1841–42	Closed in 1906 and demolished in 1909.	
St Mary Magdalen's Church	Latimer, Buckinghamshire; 51.6797°N 0.5541°W		1841–42		II
Church of St James the Great	Bethnal Green, Tower Hamlets, Greater London; 51.5268°N 0.0635°W		1841–44	Declared redundant in 1984 and converted into residential use.	
St Peter's Church	Bushley, Worcestershire; 52.0076°N 2.1835°W		1842–43		II
Holy Trinity Church	Windsor, Berkshire; 51.4787°N 0.6137°W		1842–44		II
Chapel, St John's College	Oxford; 51.7564°N 1.2586°W		1843	Remodelled.	I
Ramsey Abbey	Ramsey, Cambridgeshire; 52.4474°N 0.0976°W		1843	Alterations.	I
St John the Evangelist's Church	Cinderford, Gloucestershire; 51.8126°N 2.5051°W		1843–44		II
St Mary's Church	Great Brington, Northamptonshire; 52.2811°N 1.0233°W		1846	Restoration.	I
Glasgow Cathedral	Glasgow, Scotland; 55.8629°N 4.2346°W		1846–	Alterations.	A
St Denys' Church	Aswarby, Lincolnshire; 52.9459°N 0.4132°W		1850	Restoration.	I

== See also ==
- List of works by Edward Blore on palaces and large houses
- List of miscellaneous works by Edward Blore
