= St Thomas, Charterhouse =

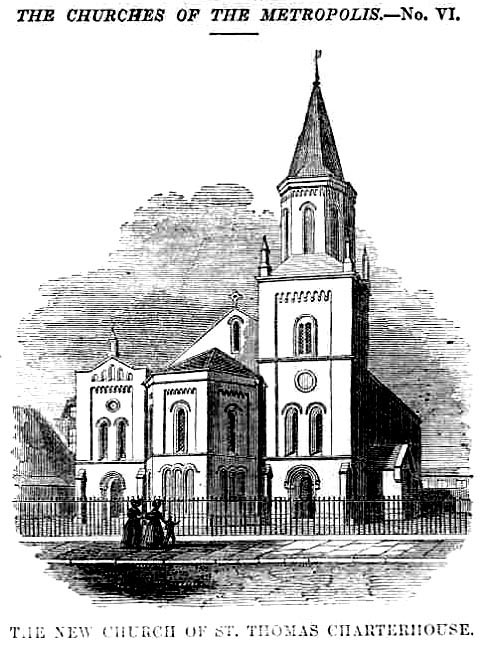
- St Thomas, Charterhouse in 1842
- St Thomas, Charterhouse
- Location: Goswell Rd, Charterhouse, Islington, London
- Country: England
- Denomination: Church of England

History
- Founded: 1842

Architecture
- Architect: Edward Blore
- Style: Gothic Revival
- Years built: 1842
- Closed: 1906
- Demolished: 1909

Administration
- Diocese: London
- Parish: St. Botolph and St. Luke, Middlesex

St Thomas Charterhouse was a Church of England church built in 1842 by the noted Victorian architect Edward Blore, who also designed Buckingham Palace. The church was closed in 1906 and was subsequently demolished in 1909.

== History ==
St Thomas was built in 1842 and designed by the architect Edward Blore. It was located in Goswell Rd, Charterhouse, Islington, London, near Smithfield.

The church had a capacity of 1,200 to 1,500 people, and was built on land donated by the governors of the Charterhouse.

The church was built in the Romanesque style, characterised by round arches. The cost of construction was £5,560, for a building intended "to provide a new place of worship for the parishes of St. Botolph and St. Luke, Middlesex".

The church was closed in 1906 and was subsequently demolished in 1909.
