= Edward Blore =

English artist and architect (1787–1897)

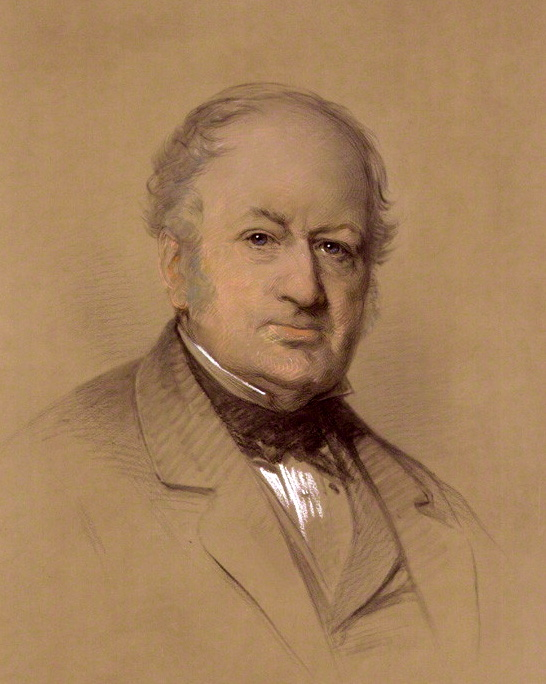
- Blore, by Georg Koberwein (1820–1876)
- Born: 13 September 1787; Derby, England
- Died: 4 September 1879 (aged 91); Manchester Square, London, England
- Resting place: Highgate Cemetery West, London, England; 51.567°N 0.147°E
- Occupation: Architect
- Known for: Buckingham Palace; Lambeth Palace restoration

Edward Blore (13 September 1787 – 4 September 1879) was an English landscape and architectural artist, architect and antiquary.

== Early career ==
Blore was born in Derby, the son of the antiquarian writer Thomas Blore.

Blore's background was in antiquarian draughtsmanship rather than architecture, in which he had no formal training. Nevertheless, he designed a large palace for Prince Mikhail Semyonovich Vorontsov in Alupka, Crimea, and important ecclesiastical furnishings designed by him included organ cases for Winchester Cathedral and Peterborough Cathedral (the Peterborough case since removed) and the choir stalls in Westminster Abbey. Charles Locke Eastlake, writing in 1872, believed that he had been apprenticed to an engraver, but other sources dispute this. He illustrated his father's History of Rutland (1811), and over the next few years he made the drawings of York Minster and Peterborough Cathedral and measured drawings of Winchester Cathedral for John Britton's English Cathedrals, and drew architectural subjects for various county histories. In 1816 he was introduced to Walter Scott and worked with William Atkinson on the design of Abbotsford House near Galashiels in Scotland. In around 1822 Blore supplied the illustrations to Thomas Frognall Dibdin's Aedes Althorpianæ. In 1823 he toured Northern England, making drawings for a work called the Monumental Remains of Noble and Eminent Persons. It was issued in parts with text by the Rev. Philip Bliss, and completed in 1826. Blore engraved many of the plates himself.

== Westminster Abbey and Lambeth Palace ==
In 1826, he was appointed Surveyor of the Fabric of Westminster Abbey. The following year he was engaged to furnish plans for the chancel fittings of Peterborough Cathedral. Shortly afterwards he was employed to restore Lambeth Palace, then in a state of near ruin. His work there included the construction of a fire-proof room for the preservation of manuscripts and archives.

Eastlake praised Blore's careful detail in his work at Westminster Abbey, adding "this was, in short, his great forte. He had studied and drawn detail so long and zealously that its design came quite naturally to him, and in this respect he was incomparably superior to his contemporaries".

== Later career ==
Blore is most notable for his completion of John Nash's design of Buckingham Palace. Following Nash's dismissal, he completed the palace in a style similar to but plainer than that intended by Nash. In 1847, Blore returned to the palace and designed the great facade facing The Mall thus enclosing the central quadrangle. He also worked on St James's Palace in London, and a large number of other designs in England and Scotland, including restoring the Salisbury Tower at Windsor Castle.

Blore was a personal friend of Sir Walter Scott, having been introduced by Daniel Terry, and like Scott was interested in the baronial architecture of Scottish castles. This led to Prince Vorontsov's invitation to design his extensive Vorontsov Palace in Alupka, Crimea. The Alupka palace was built between 1828 and 1846, in a mixture of styles ranging from Gothic Revival to Moorish Revival. The palace's guidebook describes the building as "Blore's tribute to Muslim architecture". The structure features two façades, contrasting "the starkness of Scottish Baronial on its landward side with Arabian fantasy facing the sea".

As a recognised establishment architect, Blore was involved in many projects related to the British Empire; this included Government House in Sydney, Australia, which he designed in 1834 in the form of a Gothic castle. Such designs were unusual and display a more adventurous side to Blore's work than can be seen from his work in London. His East front, the public face, of Buckingham Palace was criticised from the moment of its completion as banal street architecture, a view shared by King George V who had the façade redesigned by Sir Aston Webb in 1913. Around 1840 Blore was possibly responsible for alterations at Wythenshawe Hall in Manchester.

He was elected Fellow of the Royal Society in 1841.

== Students ==
Architects Philip Charles Hardwick and Frederick Marrable and Henry Clutton were his pupils. William Mason worked for him before going to Australia and New Zealand.

== Death ==
Blore died at home, 4, Manchester Square, London, on 4 September 1879, and was buried in Highgate Cemetery (West), Highgate, London.

== Buildings ==
- Abbotsford House
- Bedford Modern School, now the Harpur Centre facade
- Buckingham Palace
- Cambridge University Press: Pitt Building
- Chapel at College of St Mark and St John, London (1841)
- Christ Church (formerly Holy Trinity) Waltham Cross (1831-2)
- Crewe Hall, Cheshire: alterations and estate buildings
- Crom Castle, County Fermanagh, Ulster
- Goodrich Court, Herefordshire (1828)
- Government House, Sydney (1835)
- Great Moreton Hall, Congleton, Cheshire (1841–1843)
- Kingston Hall, Nottinghamshire (1842–1846)
- Lambeth Palace: restoration
- St James's Palace: alterations
- St John's Church, Stratford, London (1833–1834)
- St John the Baptist, Leytonstone, London (1832-1833)
- St Luke's Church, Berwick Street, London, 1839 (demolished 1936)
- St Peter's Church, Stepney, London (1837–1838)
- St Thomas, Charterhouse. London, 1842
- Trinity Hospital, Retford, 1833 (Grade II listed)
- Vorontsov Palace, Alupka
- Warminster Town Hall, Wiltshire (c.1837); imitates Longleat
- Watt Library, Greenock
- Westminster Abbey: choir and screen

== Gallery ==
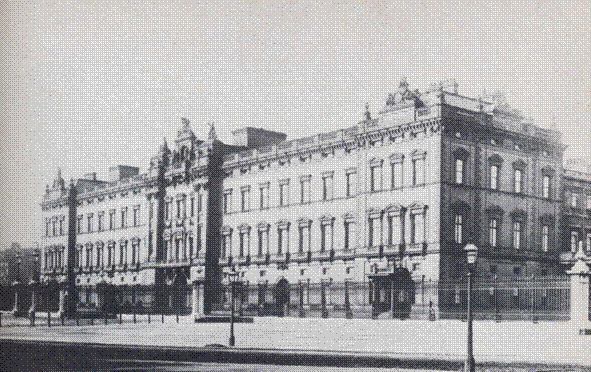
Buckingham Palace as completed by Blore in 1850. It was later refaced and altered by Aston Webb in 1913

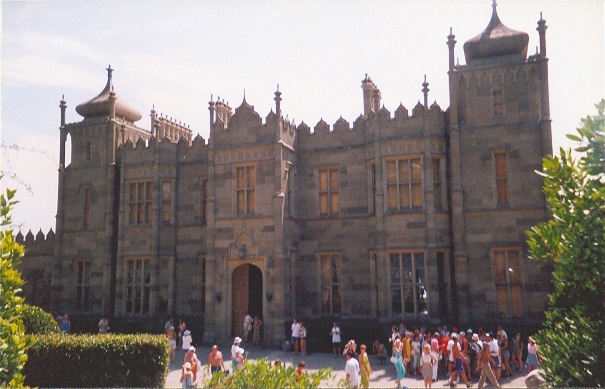
Vorontsov Palace in Alupka, Crimea (1828-1848)

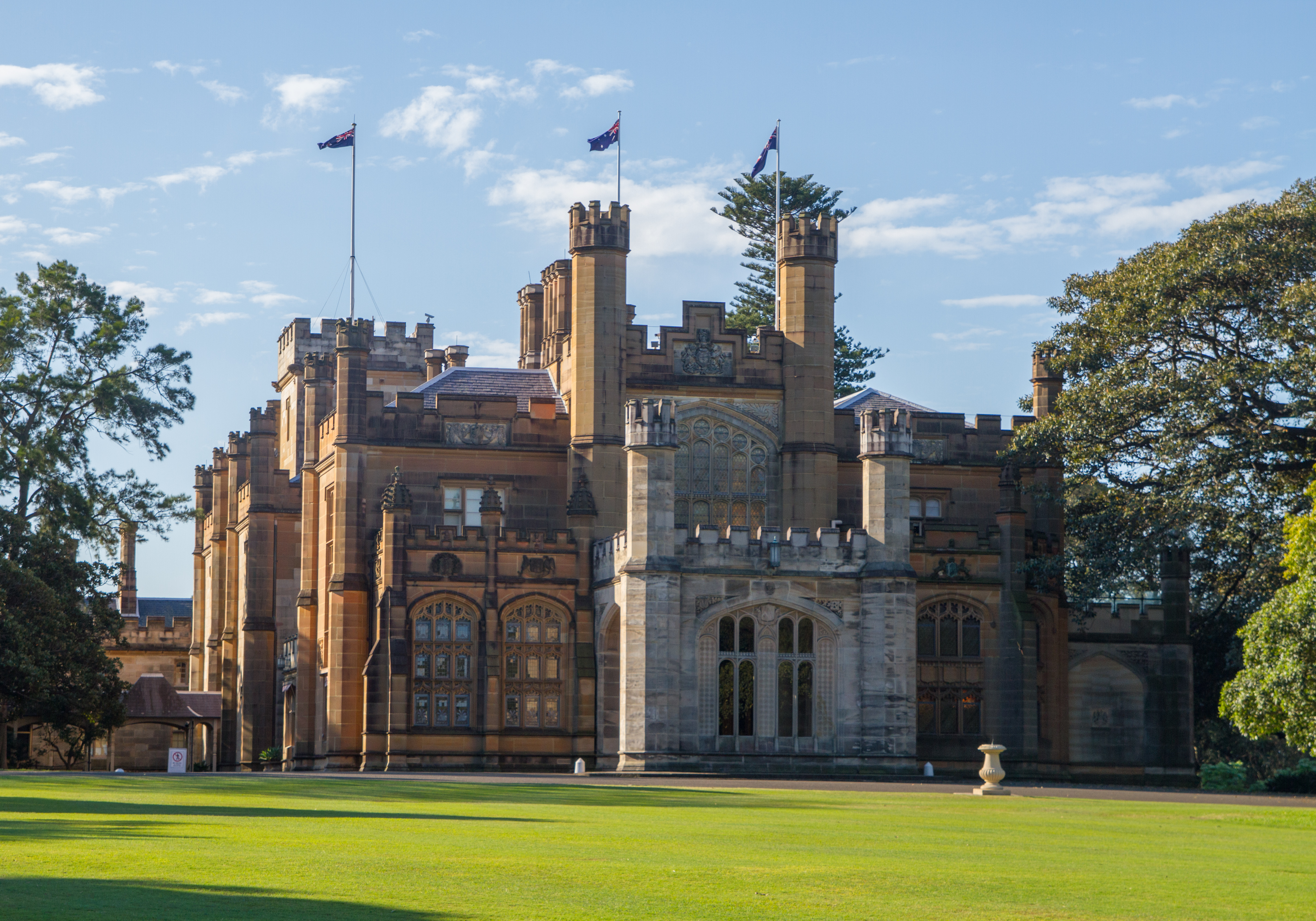
Government House, Sydney, Australia (1837-1843)

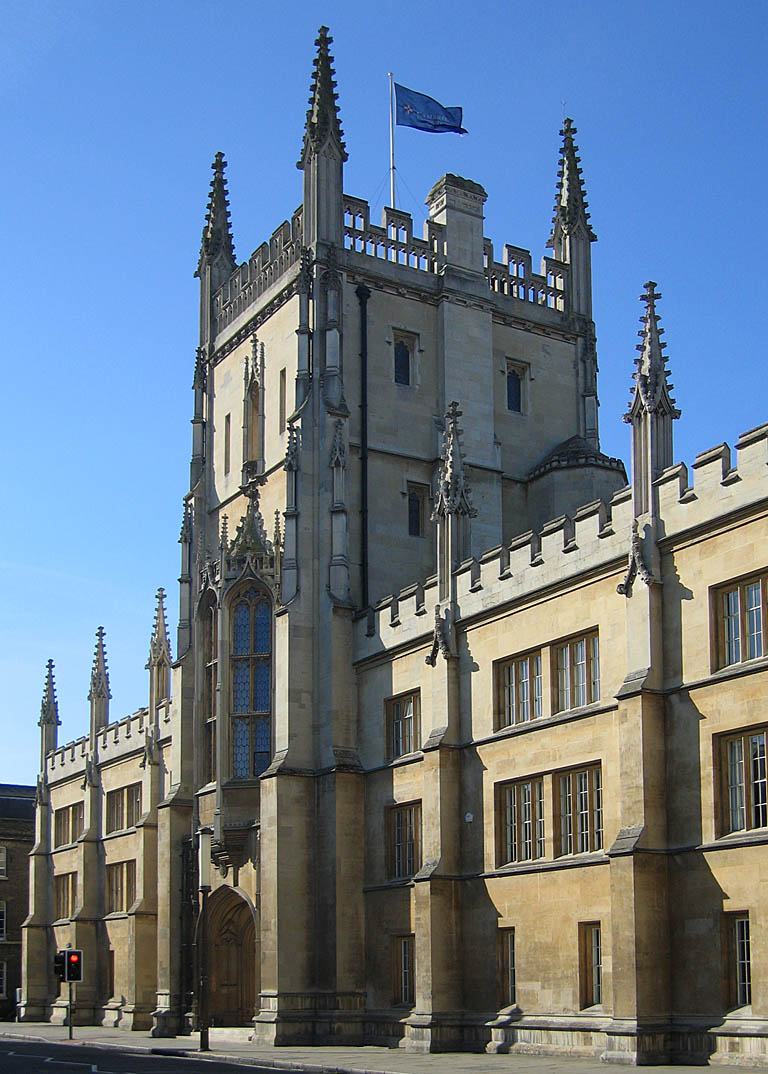
The Pitt Building, Cambridge

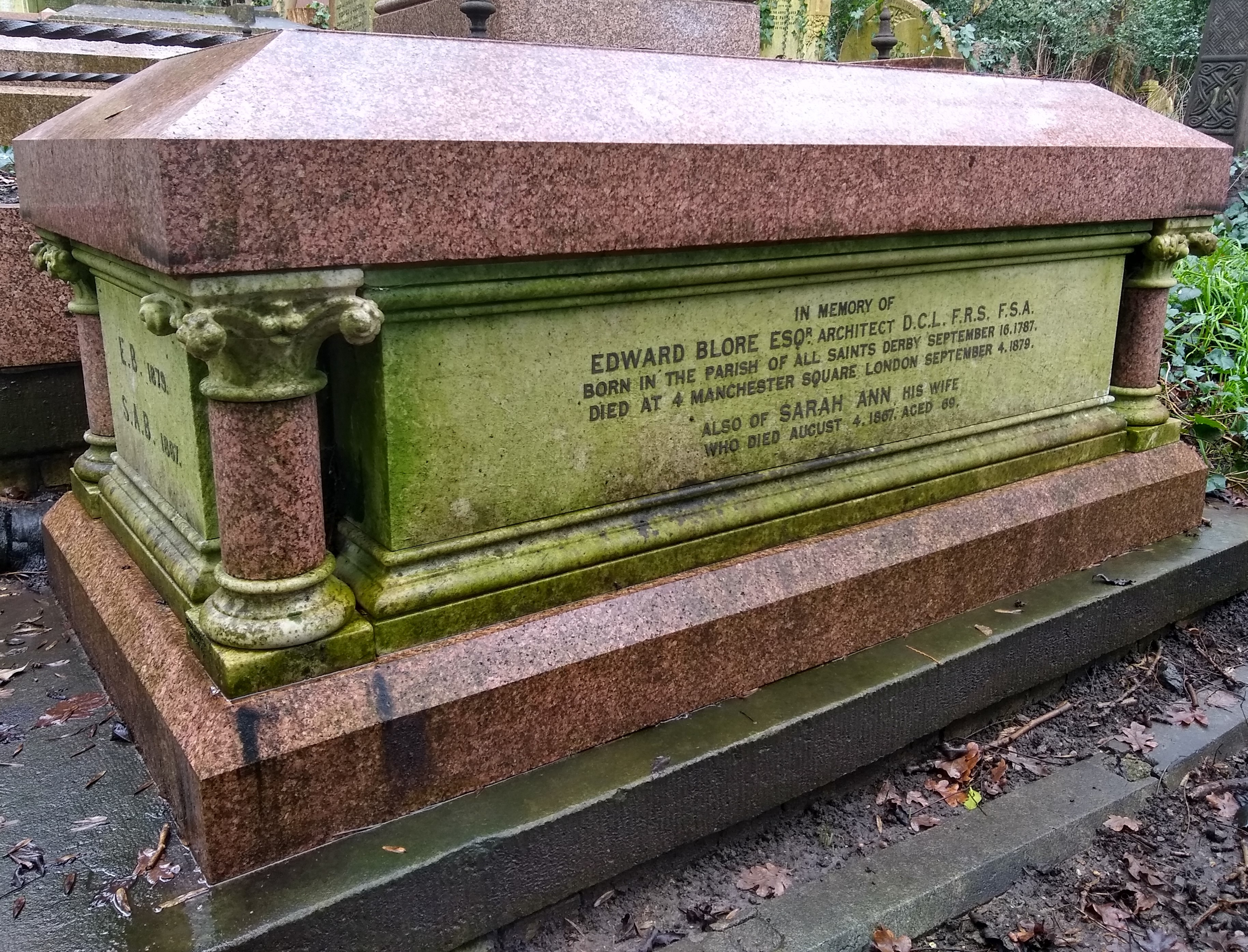
Grave of Edward Blore in Highgate Cemetery (west), Highgate, London

== See also ==
- List of ecclesiastical works by Edward Blore
- List of miscellaneous works by Edward Blore
- List of works by Edward Blore on palaces and large houses

== Sources ==
- Eastlake, Charles Locke (1872). A History of the Gothic Revival. London: Longmans, Green & Co.
