= Vorontsov Palace (Alupka) =

Building in Alupka, Crimea

Coordinates: 44°25′11″N 34°3′19″E

The Vorontsov Palace (Ukrainian: Воронцовський палац, romanized: Vorontsovs'kyi palats; Russian: Воронцовский дворец, romanized: Vorontsovskiy Dvorets) or the Alupka Palace (Note: The Alupka Palace (Ukrainian: Алупкінський палац; Russian: Алупкинский дворец) name was contrived during Soviet times to remove mention to the Vorontsov noble family.) is a historic palace situated at the foot of the Crimean Mountains near the town of Alupka in Crimea. The Vorontsov Palace is one of the oldest and largest palaces in Crimea, and has been one of the most popular tourist attractions on Crimea's southern coast.

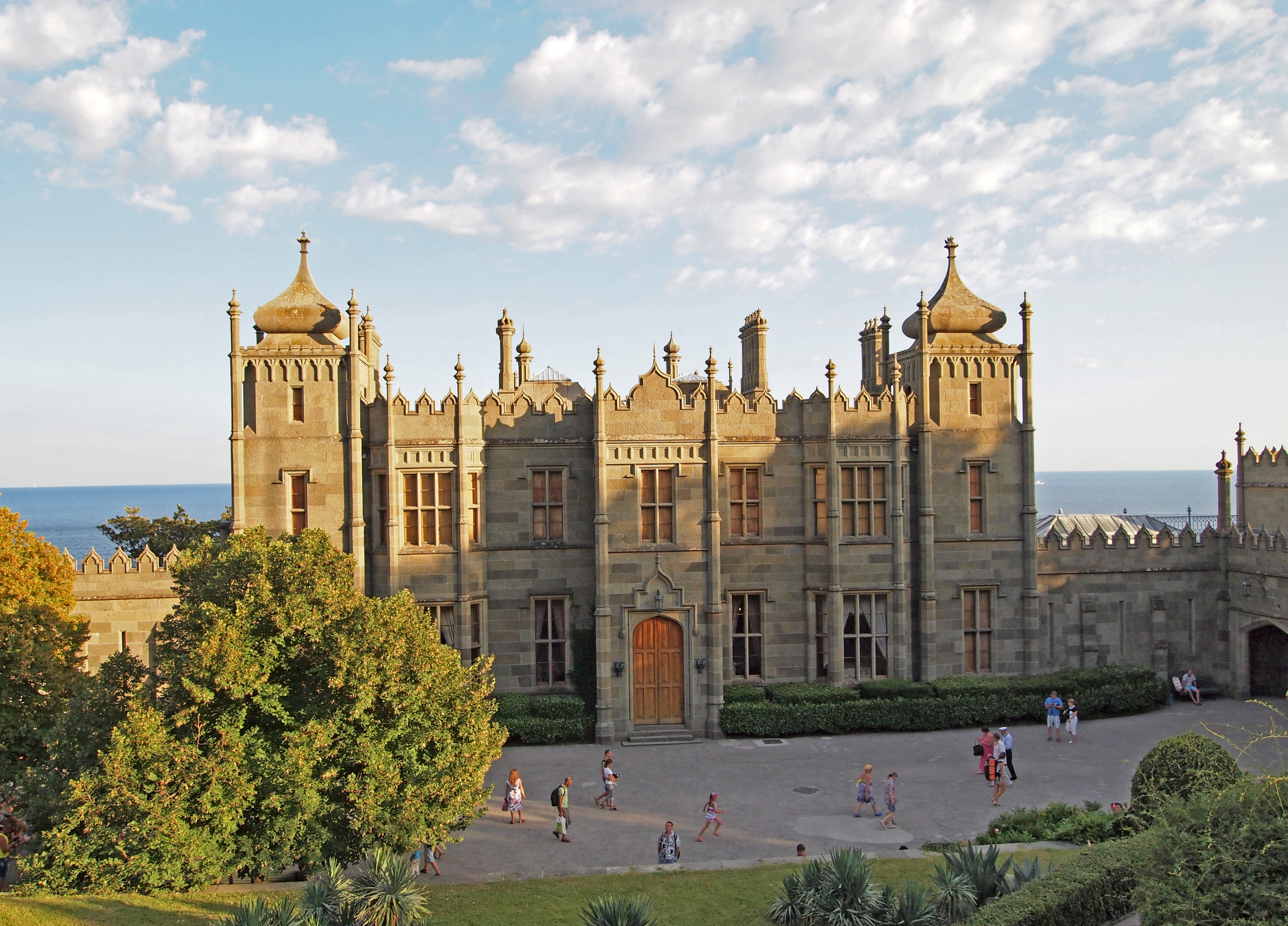
The Vorontsov Palace: the northern entrance façade. The stone was quarried locally as part of a conscious effort to blend the building with its mountainous surroundings.

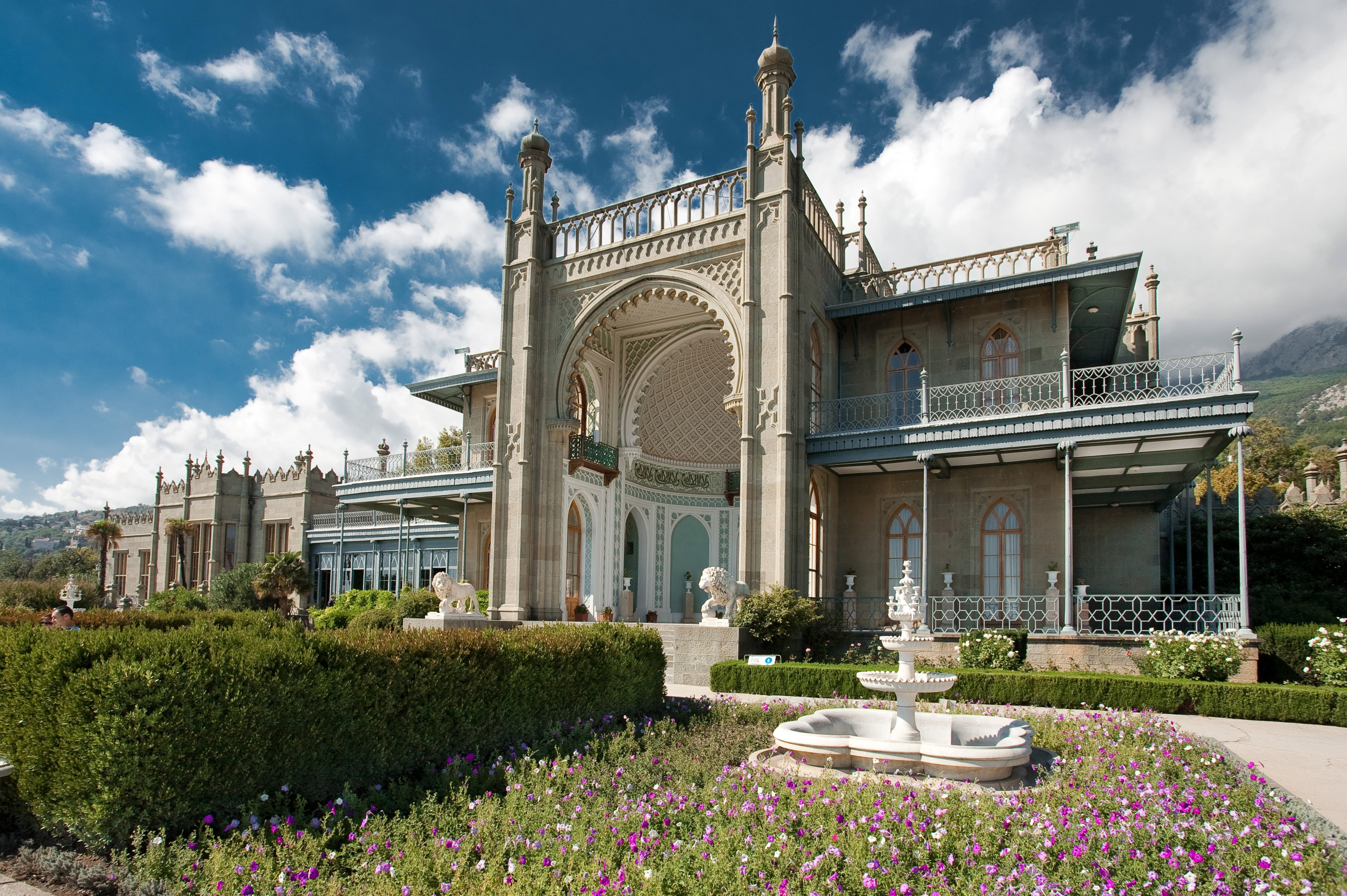
The southern façade of the main building is built in the style of an iwan, which is common in Islamic architecture.

The palace was built between 1828 and 1848 for the Russian Prince Mikhail Semyonovich Vorontsov for use as his personal summer residence at a cost of 9 million roubles. It was designed in a loose interpretation of the English Renaissance revival style by English architect Edward Blore and his assistant William Hunt. The building is a hybrid of several architectural styles, but faithful to none. Among those styles are elements of Scottish Baronial, Indo-Saracenic Revival Architecture, and Gothic Revival architecture. Blore had designed many buildings in the United Kingdom, and was later particularly well known there for completing the design of Buckingham Palace in London.

Once completed, the palace was visited by many members of the Russian Empire's elite ruling class; a great number of these vastly wealthy nobles were so taken with the palace and its seaboard site that they were moved to create their own summer retreats in the Crimea. By the early 20th century not only many aristocrats, but also members of the Imperial Family, including the Tsar himself, had palaces in an assortment of architectural styles in the vicinity.

An important feature of the Vorontsov Palace is the adjoining park ensemble, which features 40 hectares (99 acres) of greenery and forestry arranged by German landscape gardener Carolus Keebach. Today, the Vorontsov Palace is a part of the "Alupka Palace and Park Complex," a national historical reserve including the Massandra Palace in neighbouring Massandra. The palace was also recorded by Ukraine as being a monument of national architectural significance and assigned the protection number 0100109.

Owing to its status as an important local tourist attraction and architectural monument, the Vorontsov Palace and its surrounding park complex were frequently featured in Ukrainian and Soviet cinema productions such as: An Ordinary Miracle (1964), Nebesnye lastochki (1976), Crazy Day or The Marriage of Figaro (2004), and Sappho (2008).

Russian poet Ivan Bunin visited the palace in 1900 and wrote a short poem entitled "Long alley leading down to the shore ..." (Russian: К прибрежью моря длинная аллея ...).

== History ==
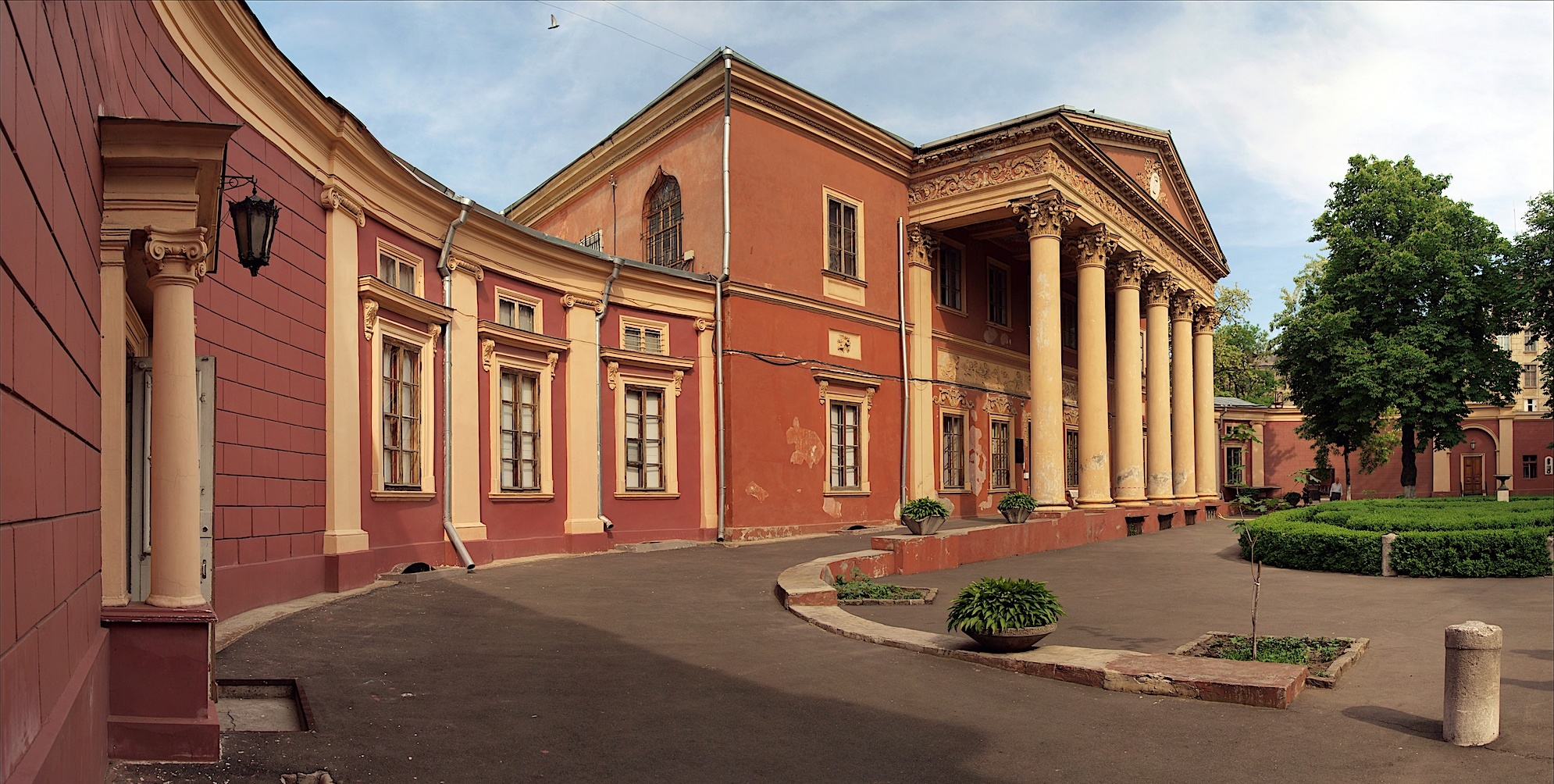
In the 1820s, Russian noblemen commissioned a number of Palladian residences in Novorossiya, primarily in Odessa.

In the period following the Napoleonic Wars, the new city of Odessa emerged as Russia's southern capital with a vibrant cosmopolitan society centred on a handful of Russian aristocrats and Polish noblewomen such as Zofia Potocka and Karolina Rzewuska. According to Filipp Vigel, the viceroy's court in Odessa looked like a "small capital of an imperial fürst". While many Neoclassical buildings appeared in Odessa, the Crimea (or Taurica, as it was then better known) was still perceived as a wild, exotic hinterland. The mid-1820s saw the appearance of highly popular Romantic works celebrating its rugged beauty, such as Alexander Pushkin's poem The Fountain of Bakhchisaray and Adam Mickiewicz's Crimean Sonnets. Both poets were fascinated with Lord Byron's Oriental romances and pictured the Crimea as an exotic land of Tartar Muslim traditions which had flourished in the Khanate of Crimea until its demise in 1783.

Mikhail Vorontsov was appointed Viceroy of Novorossiya in May 1823. Even before their arrival in Odessa, the Vorontsovs started buying up lands in the southwest of Crimea, which was sparsely populated and little known at the time. Alupka was bought in 1824 from colonel Theodosios Reveliotis, the owner of Livadia and Oreanda. By that time, the Vorontsovs also had property in Gurzuf, Massandra, Ai-Danil, and Cape Martian.

=== Original design and ethos ===
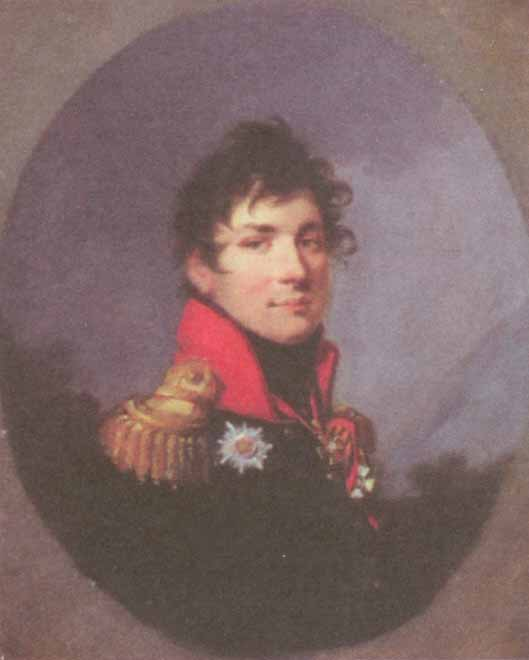
Prince Mikhail Vorontsov (1782–1856) commissioned the palace for use as his own summer residence.

The Vorontsov Palace was commissioned as a summer residence for the Governor-General of Novorossiya, Prince Mikhail Semyonovich Vorontsov (born 1782 – died 1856). The Prince was a dedicated Anglophile. His father, Semyon Vorontsov, had been Catherine the Great's ambassador to England, and the Prince had been educated in London. His sister, Catherine, had married an English aristocrat and become the châtelaine of one of England's grandest country houses, Wilton House. On the accession of Paul I, in 1796, Semyon Vorontsov fell from favour and his estates confiscated and not returned until 1801, after the accession of Alexander I. It is therefore unsurprising that he chose to reside with his daughter in England until his death and that Mikhail Vorontsov was a frequent visitor to that country.

Vorontsov had been purchasing land from the local Tartars for the site of his new palace at Alupka from 1823; however, the acquisition had been part of a deal which necessitated Vorontsov to build a new mosque. Part of the site had already been planted with fine trees in 1787 for Prince Potemkin by the English landscape gardener William Gould as part of Potemkin's "improvements" to the area in preparation of a visitation by Catherine the Great following Potemkin's bloodless annexation of the Crimea to Russia. On acquiring ownership of the site, Vorontsov immediately employed the German gardener Karl Kebach to further improve the site and layout the grounds and gardens for the proposed new palace.

Thomas Harrison's abandoned classical design for the garden facade centred on an exedra; this feature was to be retained in the new plan.

In 1824, the architect Philip Elson was commissioned to build a small house for the Vorontsov family to inhabit while the new palace was under construction. Now much altered in form, and known as the Asiatic Pavilion, this building still stands.

Originally, the prince wanted a strictly Classical design, and plans for such a design were executed, in Chester by architect Thomas Harrison and modified, on site, by Odessa architect Francesco Boffo. The two architects had previously worked together on the design for Vorontsov's official residence in Odessa. Harrison's plans for the palace at Alupka show a classical villa on the site of the present palace's corps de logis with bedroom floors below, on what are now the lower terraces of the present palace. On the garden front, facing the sea, the plans show a large double height classical exedra; Vorontsov must have approved of this concept, as it was the only feature (albeit transformed to an Islamic style) to be incorporated from Harrison's plans into the new plans.

Construction began in 1828, however, it was suspended in June 1831 before the building has risen from its foundations. This may have been because the principal architect Harrison had died the previous year and Boffo working alone may not have been an option – his alterations to Harrison's plans for the Governor's residence in Odessa had been unfavourably received.

=== Change of plan ===
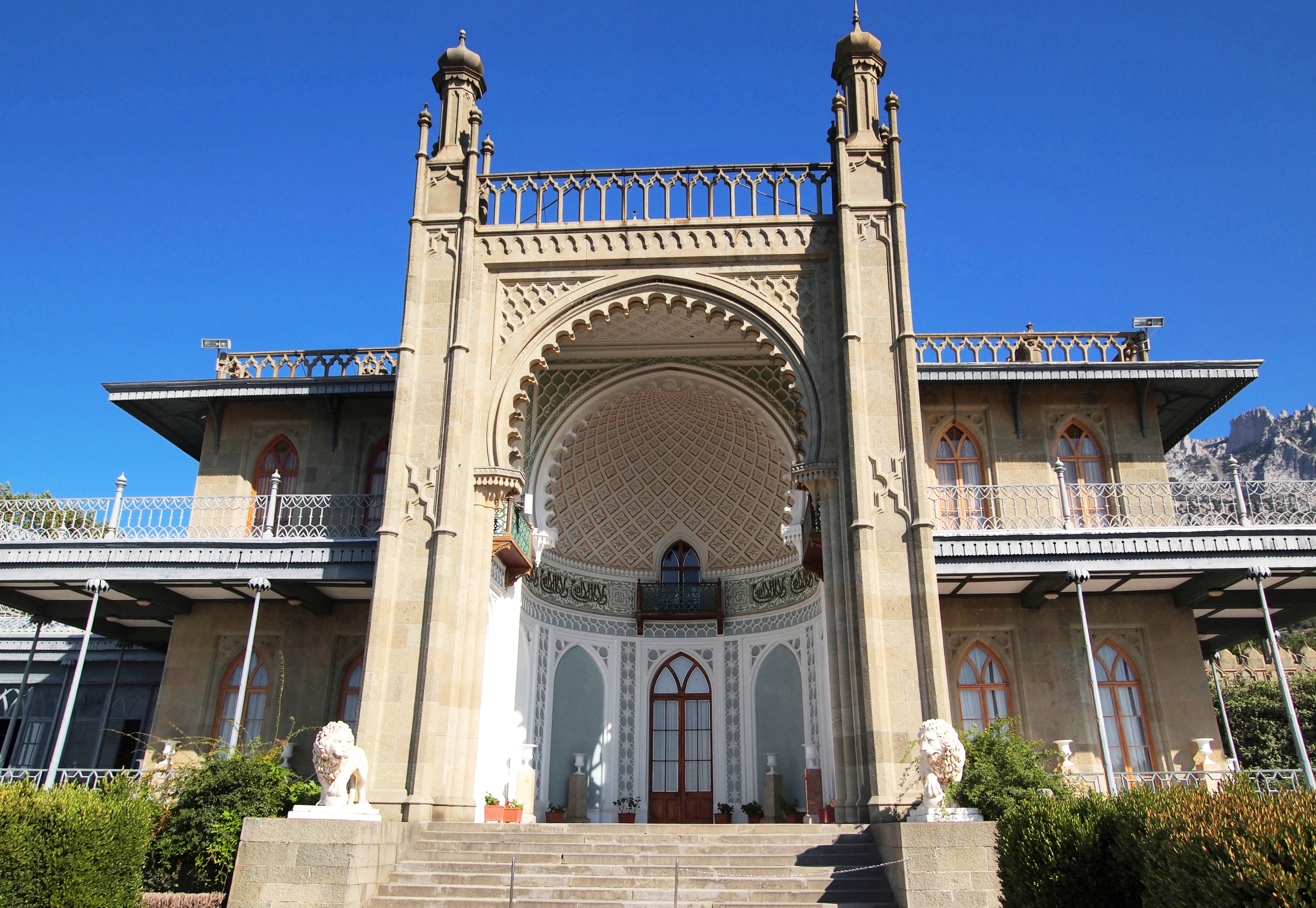
Architecturally at odds with the northern entrance facade, Blore's Islamic southern garden façade has a massive central exedra which forms an open mosque-like vestibule.

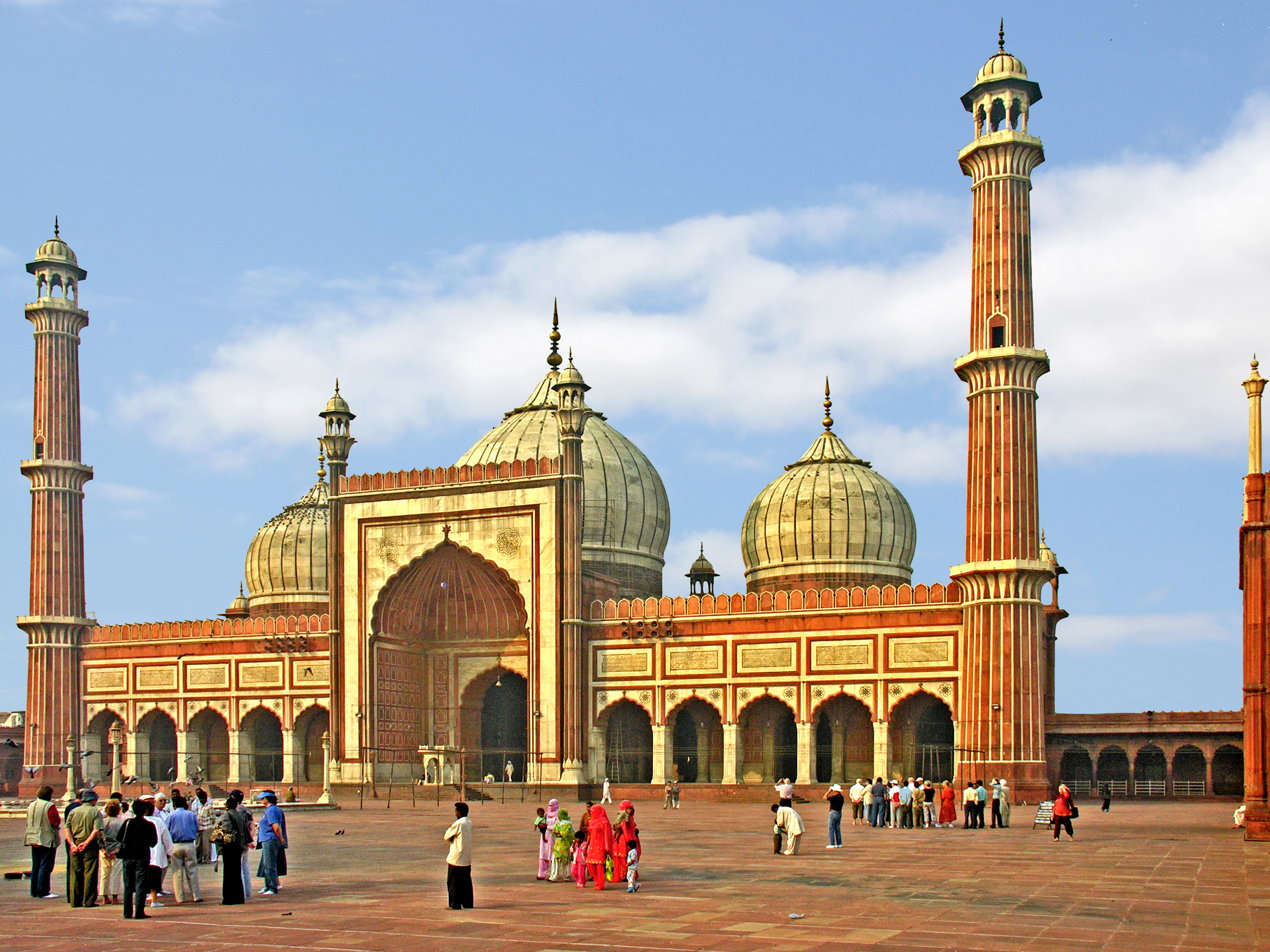
The Jama Masjid mosque (above) was the inspiration for Blore's new design.

Vorontsov had travelled widely in England, and had doubtless seen the newly emerging, but retrospective, Jacobethan style of architecture – a hybrid revival styles based on the English buildings of the late 16th and early 17th centuries, which, in turn, had been influenced by the English Renaissance style which had belatedly evolved from the Italian Renaissance style of a century earlier. Vorontsov decided to review the design in order to incorporate these new trends from Western European architecture.

This major change from a Classical design to a far more complex revival style, little known in Russia, meant Vorontsov had to find an alternative architect to execute a new design. This was further complicated by Vorontsov's desire to not only have a loose Jacobean style, but also to incorporate motifs from Islamic architecture so as to highlight the oriental strain evident in the Khan's Palace, Enikale Fort, and other local Tatar architecture. The resulting design was to highlight the Crimea's position as a place where the East and West meet. It was a radical departure from the Neoclassical strain that dominated the Russian architecture of the period.

As a result of the expansion of the British Empire, a similar approach was also gaining popularity in Britain. An Anglicised interpretation of Islamic architecture is exemplified by the Brighton Royal Pavilion, completed in 1823, and the Sezincote House, completed a few years earlier. Both these buildings drew heavily on the Islamic motifs, which were later to be evident at the Vorontsov Palace and were new and novel designs at the time of the Prince's visit to England.

Vorontsov decided upon the British architect Edward Blore to redesign and complete the building. Blore was a curious choice of architect; though able, his work has often been often considered bland and uninspired. The eminent architectural historian Howard Colvin claimed that "a dull competence pervaded all his work", while the country house architectural expert Mark Girouard has described Blore as "a bit of a bore." However, Blore's stolid and conventional designs were admired by the English Tory aristocracy – a class to which Vorontsov's sister belonged and for whom Blore had worked at Wilton. The Anglophile Vorontsov was also a great admirer and friend of Sir Walter Scott, for whom Blore had worked at the great Scottish baronial country house Abbotsford; therefore it seems likely that these latter connections led Vorontsov to Blore.

Blore had already worked on many grand British buildings and a couple of buildings in colonial Australia. Blore himself did not visit the town of Alupka, however, he was well informed about the area's mountainous landscape and terrain. Construction restarted in 1830, under the supervision of Blore's fellow architect William Hunt.

=== Architecture ===
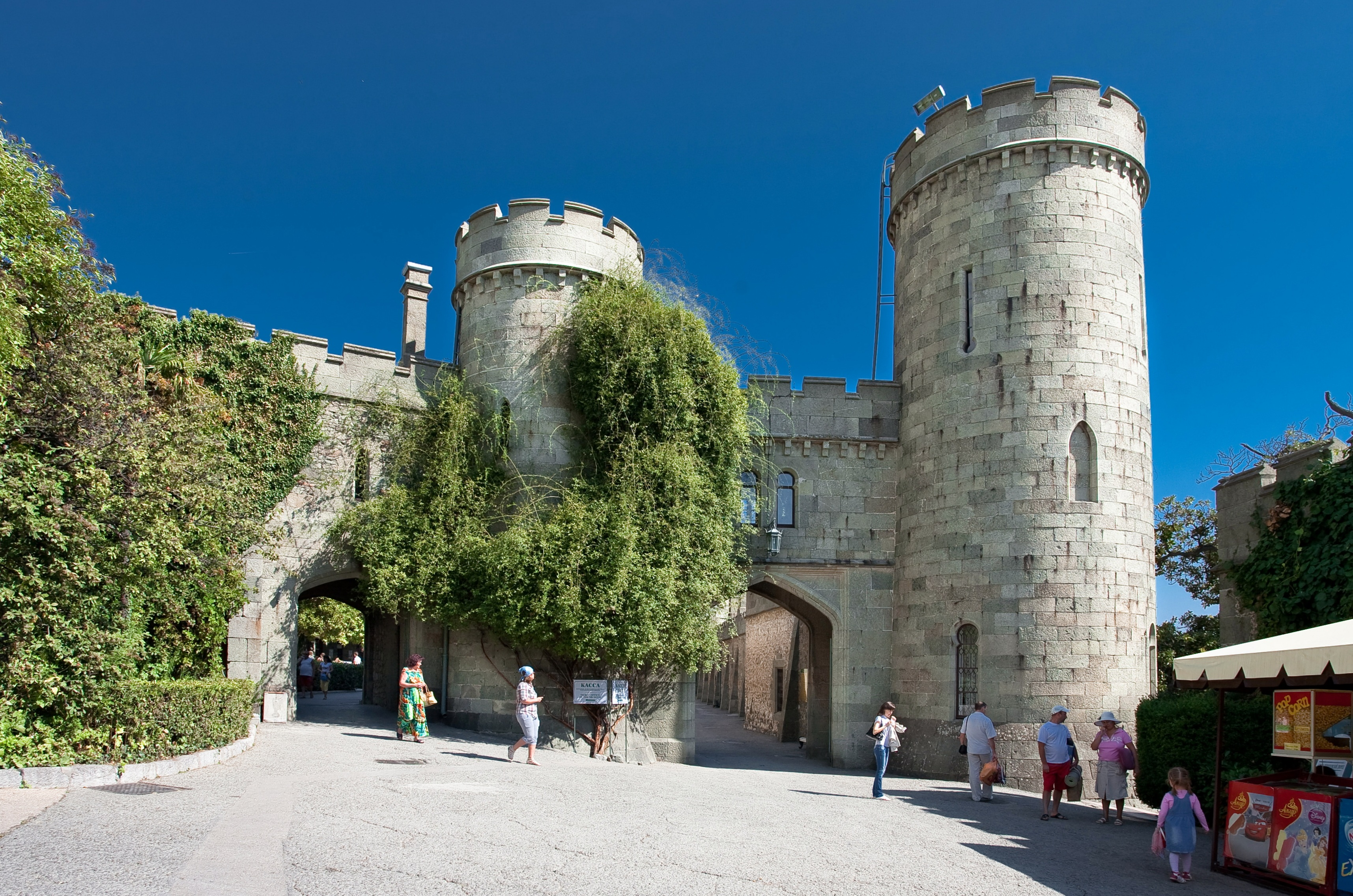
The Western Gatehouse gives access to the warren of secondary wings. On the right, to the Shuvalov Passage and main entrance, and on the left, to the stables and staff wings.

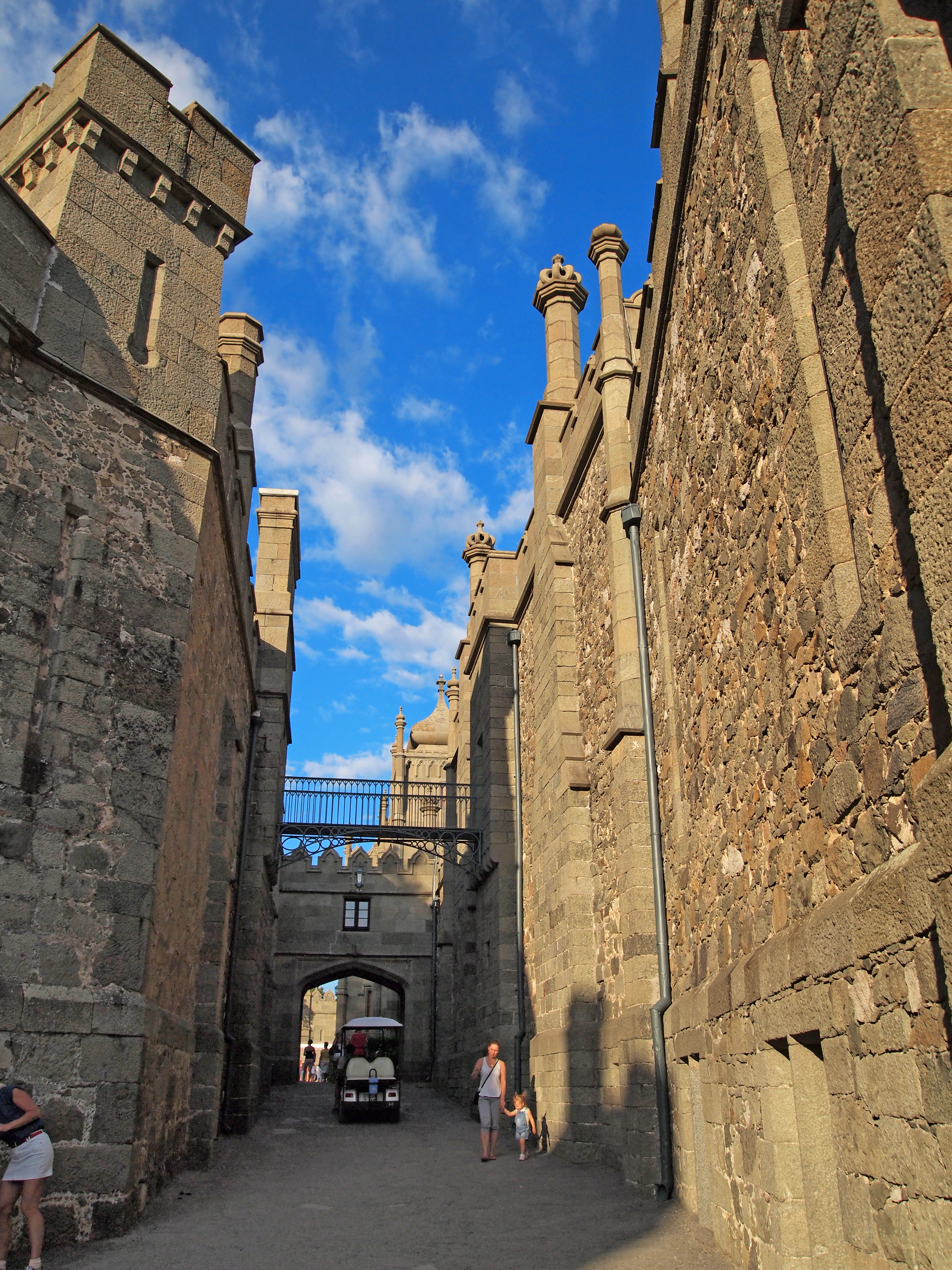
Designed to resemble a medieval street, the Shuvalov Passage leads from the Western Gatehouse, through the secondary wings, to the forecourt before the principal entrance in the northern facade

Blore's new plan for the corps de logis was constrained by Vorontsov's wish to use the footings and foundations which had been built for Harrison's original design; this severely restricted the shape, size and layout of the palaces principal rooms. However, rather than erect a compact and low classical villa, as Harrison had designed, Blore's plan was radically different, with strong English Tudor Renaissance features on the northern side, and an eclectic medley of western and Islamic features on the southern. The central bay of the southern façade was inspired by Delhi's Jummah Masjid mosque, which enabled the classical exedra of Harrison's design to be incorporated, once given an Islamic makeover, harmoniously into the design.

In places, the seemingly at odds architectural styles can be viewed simultaneously; this is particularly so in the chimney stacks which resemble Islamic minarets. These coupled with the castellated parapets add what appears to be an almost Moorish element to the late English Renaissance air of the northern façade.

However, it is the southern garden façade which displays the strongest of the building's Islamic influences; it has a flat roof and is topped by two minaret-style towers at its centre. These minarets flank the massive, central bay, this takes the form of a projecting double height porch entered through a high Islamic horseshoe arch. The interior of the porch takes the form of an exedra, which is really an elaborately decorated open vestibule; it has an inscribed Shahada stating "There is no God but Allah" in Arabic. The porch is flanked by two short wings, each of two bays and adorned with cast iron balconies and verandahs overlooking over the terraces and their statuary.

While the designs for the corps de logis were confined by the foundations of Harrison's earlier plan, the secondary wings and precincts were not. Abandoning completely Harrisons concept of bedrooms set in terraces beneath the corp de logis, Blore's assistant architect, Hunt, opted for the typical vast sprawling wings and servants' quarters of the 19th century English country house. These took full advantage of the gradients and topography of the site, and with their courtyards came to resemble a small medieval, fortified town of towers and high castellated walls. Nowhere is this more evident than the Shuvalov Passage, an enclosed carriage drive squeezed between the high walls of two wings, leading from the castellated Western Gatehouse to the forecourt before the northern façade. The passage, which twists and turn beneath high wall and towers and even passes under a bridge, resembles the street of a medieval town, rather than the approach to a country house.

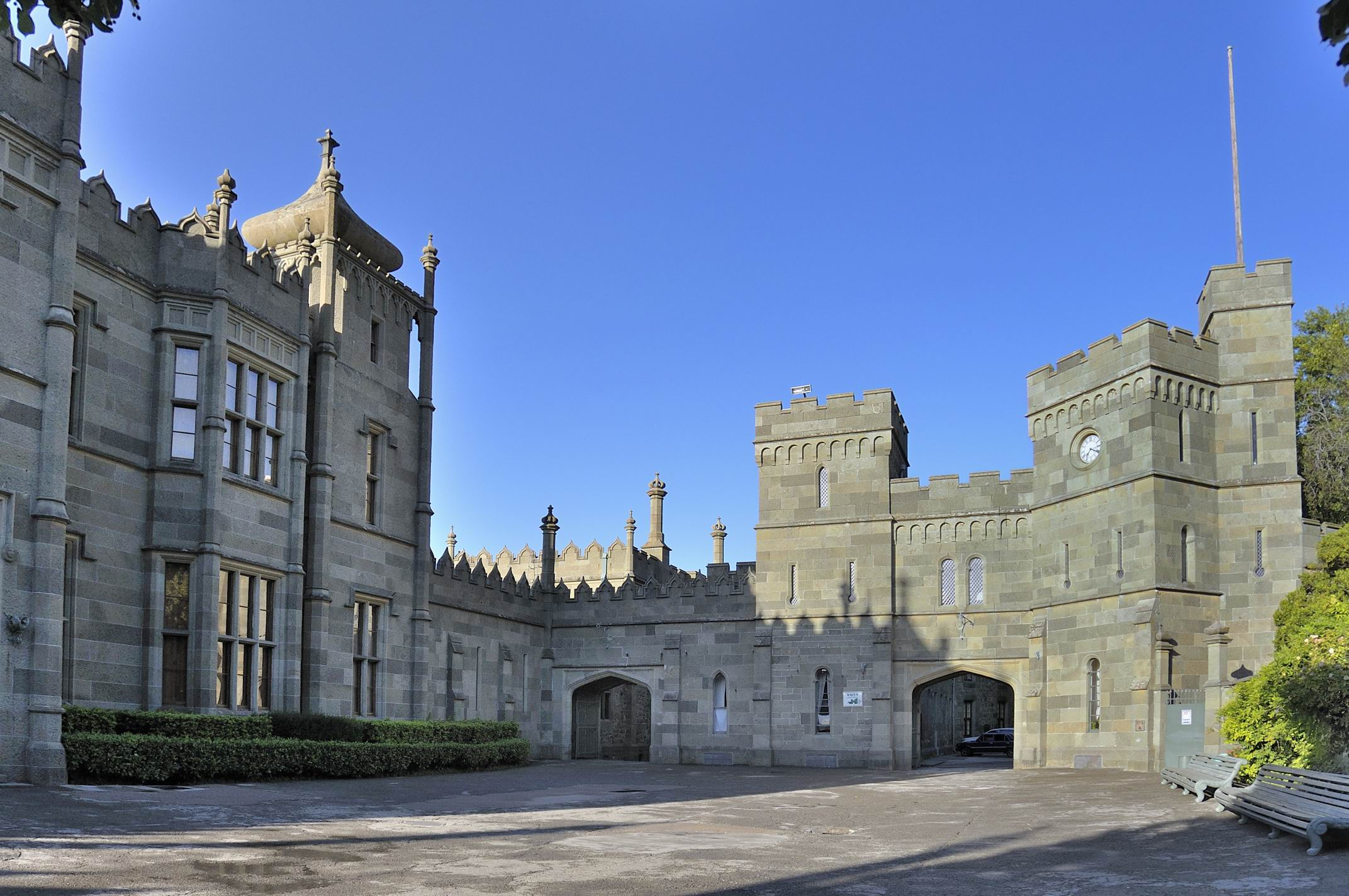
The North Forecourt, accessed from the Shuvalov Passage which emerges from the lefthand arch, serves as a cour d'honneur to the corps de logis (to the left). To the right, can be seen part of the vast service wings and stables

=== Construction ===
Vorontsov imported thousands of his serfs from the Moscow, Vladimir, and Voronezh governorates of the Russian Empire to construct the palace. These unpaid workers performed all the labour by hand, aided only by primitive hand tools. Masons were also brought in to help with the construction. The palace's ashlar blocks were made from a local greenish-gray tinge diabase, chosen for its unique colour to match the colours of the surrounding mountainous landscape and forest greenery. All other building materials were imported from outside the Empire.

One of the first of the palace's many rooms to be completed was the main dining room, built from 1830 to 1834. The principal central wing of the mansion was constructed from 1831 to 1837. Between 1841 and 1842, a billiard room was constructed adjoining the dining room. From 1838 through to 1844, the guest wing, the east wing, towers, the service wing, and the front entrance were completed. The final wing built of the mansion was the library wing; this was under construction from 1842 to 1844. The remaining four years of building works were spent on the palace's interior decoration.

William Hunt, the onsite architect employed to oversee Blore's design, while remaining faithful to Blore's overall plans, was not afraid to alter them. Most notably, the Western Gatehouse, the main approach to the palace, was intended to have octagonal towers, but Hunt redesigned the gatehouse in an English 14th-century castle style, with solid round towers and machicolations, nearly identical to the towers at Bodiam Castle, East Sussex.

After completion of the palace, Hunt remained at Alupka working on an assortment of projects in and around the estate building long carriage drives, roads and structural improvements to the gardens surrounding the palace. One of his largest projects was an extension to the palace itself, the Shuvalov wing, which was to be the summer retreat of the Vorontsov's daughter Countess Sofia Shuvalova and her children, the countess was estranged from her husband This wing linked the palace to the western gatehouse, and created the enclosed Shuvalov Passage leading to the main entrance. Hunt remained in the Prince's employ until his retirement in 1852.

== Interior ==
The palace consists of a total of 150 rooms, the principal of which are panelled with wood block floors. Inside the corps de logis, it had been Blore's intention to follow the English 19th century tradition of distinct masculine and feminine suites of reception rooms; with a library, dining rooms and billiard room ensuite to left of the central hall for men, and a massive drawing room to the right for women. This layout of gender designated zones had become popular in Victorian England; however its intention was not to segregate the sexes, but more to define furnishings – the male zones tended to have heavy oak furniture and dark 'Turkey' carpets, whereas the female zones would have more delicate furnishings of rosewood, Aubusson carpets and chintz soft furnishings. However, for unknown reasons, this concept was never executed and the female part of the house was extended into the male territory, with the intended billiard room becoming the countess's boudoir while the study became a further small sitting room for feminine use. Above these seaward facing rooms were the family bedrooms.

Following the female claim to the principal rooms of the corps de logis, the library and dining room were relocated to a secondary wing not built until much later. This secondary wing is linked to the west of corps de logis by a large arcaded loggia; originally open, it is now glazed and known as the Winter Garden. A later secondary wing, known as the Shuvalov wing (named after Vorontsov's son-in-law, Count Shuvalov) was not part of Blore's original plan and designed by his assistant, William Hunt.

There is now a museum comprising several rooms most notable of which are the blue room, chintz room, dining room, and the Chinese cabinet. The museum covers the first floor's first eight rooms, featuring more than 11,000 exhibits, including engravings of the 18th century, paintings from the 16th through 19th centuries, including those depicting Crimean scenarios by Armenian seascape painter Ivan Aivazovsky, as well as furniture crafted by Russian wood masters from the 19th century.

The library, the last of the palace's rooms to be completed, is based on Sir Walter Scott's own library, revealing the personal friendship that Blore had with Scott. Inside, the library features about 6,000 literary and musical works of the 18th and 19th centuries. The interior's woodwork, including the doors, panelling, and ceilings, is made out of oak. The walls are adorned in cloth, with designs made by Dutch, Flemish, French, and Italian painters. The palace's Gothic fireplaces are made out of polished diabase.

== Grounds ==
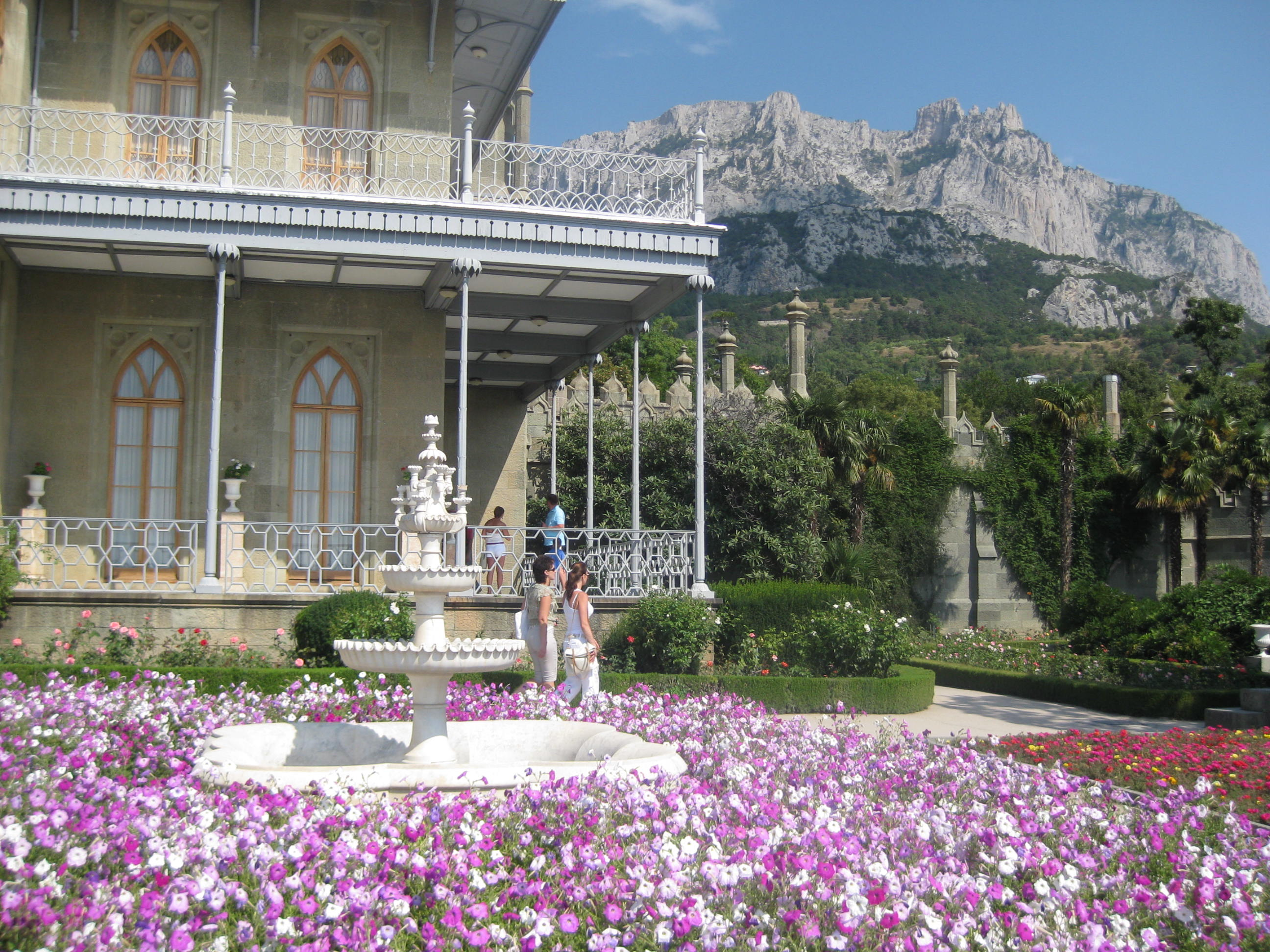
Formal parterre bedding on the uppermost terrace

The palace sits surrounded by gardens and a park; these grounds consisting of 40 hectares (99 acres) were laid out by the German landscape gardener Carolus Keebach in the first half of the 19th century in the form of an amphitheatre featuring wide open spaces and gardens planted alongside the walkways. The walkways are gravelled with 29 bags of coloured stones from the Crimean village of Koktebel.

The largest of the landscaping undertakings carried out on the palace's grounds were performed between 1840 and 1848 with the aid of soldiers, who also assisted in the formation and leveling of the terraces laid out before of the palace's southern façade. Fauna was introduced from various locations throughout the world, including the Mediterranean, the Americas, and East Asia. Flora imported over a 150 years ago still numbers almost 200 species.

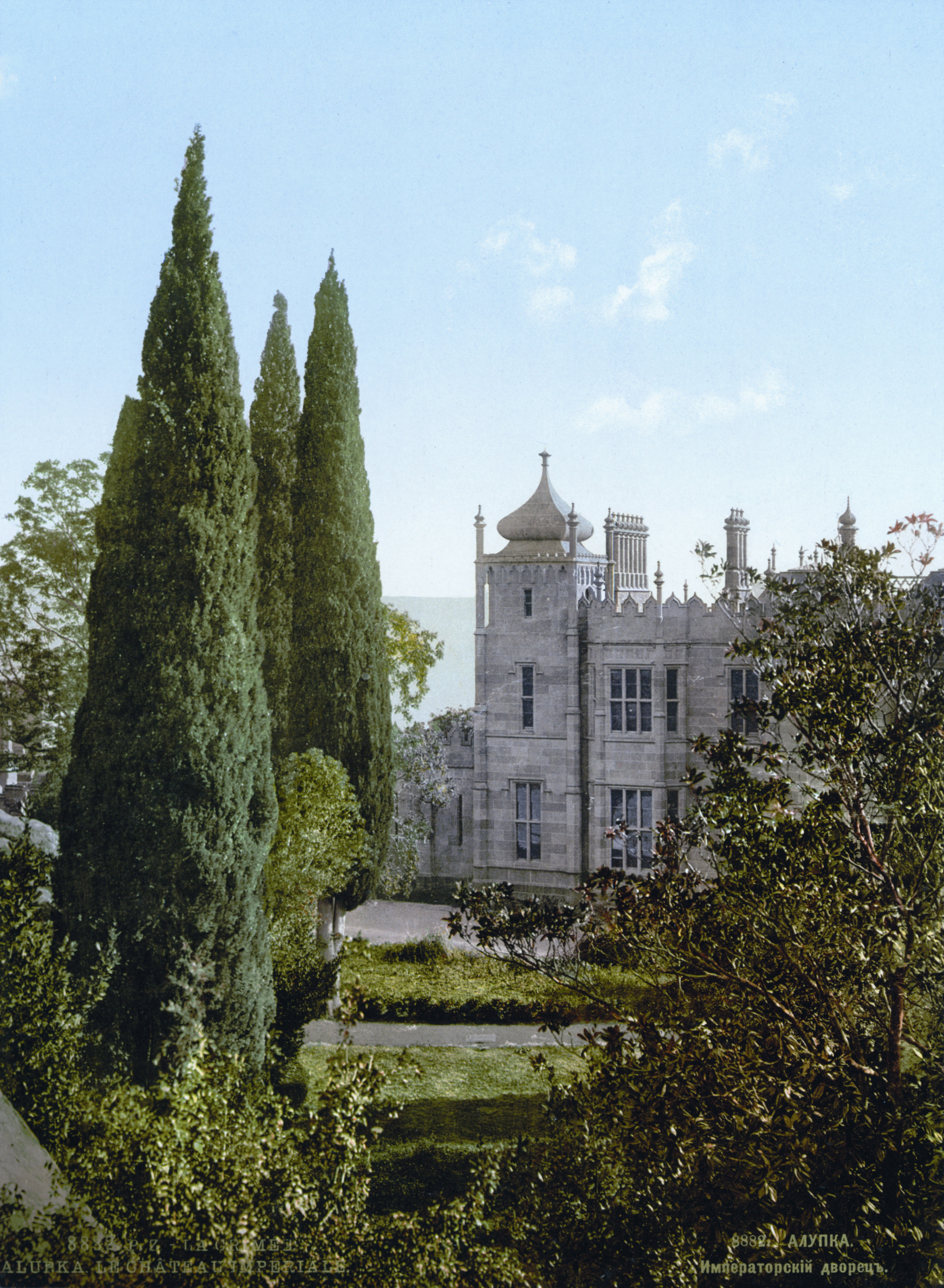
A 19th-century vintage postcard showing the Vorontsov Palace viewed through its manicured gardens

Keebach had the park designed in such a way that it would incorporate the landscape's native vegetation, mountain springs, and nearby rocky masses, in addition to foreign plant species brought in from the Mediterranean, both North and South America, as well as from East Asia. Today, the park still features more than 200 exotic tree and shrub species, including a wide variety of palm trees, oleander shrubs, laurels, cypresses, olive trees, and evergreen viburnum, among many others.

In the summer of 1848, the palace and its grounds were enhanced by the addition of three pairs of white marble lions; this statuary was placed alongside the wide flight of steps climbing the terraces to the palace. Each of the statues, by Italian sculptor Giovanni Bonnani, is depicted in a varying pose – a pair of "sleeping lions" at the bottom of the steps, "waking lions" near the centre, and "standing Medici lions" at the top nearest the palace. The sculptures of this Lion Terrace gained international recognition when three of them—the sleeping, waking, and half-risen lions—were featured in Sergei Eisenstein’s Battleship Potemkin (1925). Through montage editing, Eisenstein arranged shots of these sculptures to create the illusion of a lion rising, symbolizing revolutionary awakening.

Crimea's coastal highway runs through the park, dividing it into the upper and lower portions. The upper park is dominated by the mountain springs, as well as by the native southern coast forestry and clusters of foreign tree growth. A feature of the upper park is the Fountain of Trilby, which was placed there in 1829. The lower park is modelled in the style of an Italian Renaissance garden.

== Influence ==
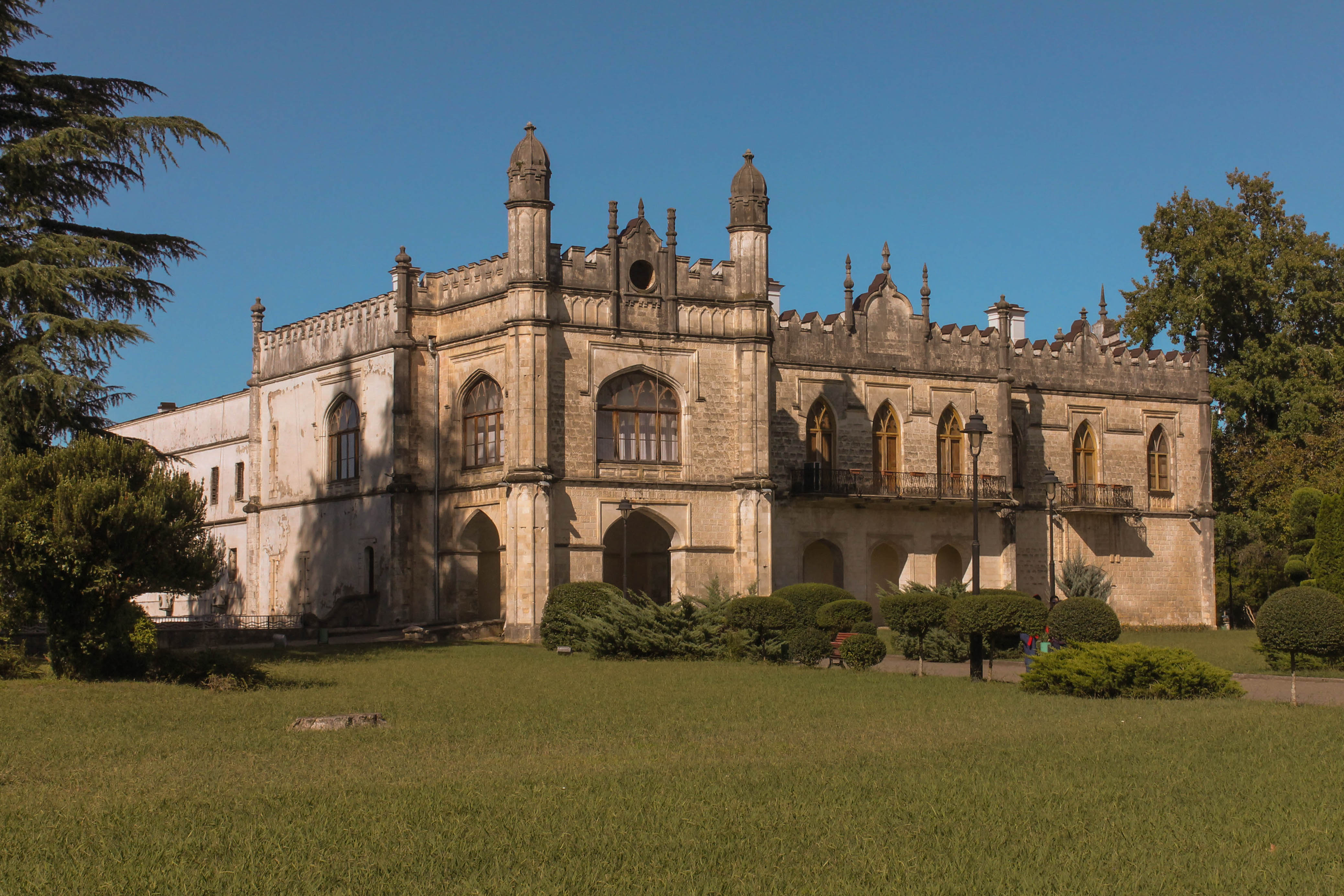
The palace of Princess Catherine Dadiani in Zugdidi, Georgia (1873–78)

The construction of Mikhail Vorontsov's summer residence in Alupka so impressed Tsar Nicholas I that he decided to have his own family retreat built at neighbouring Oreanda. In September 1837, the Tsar and Tsarina visited the Crimea for the first time. The viceroy entertained them at his new residence in Alupka. Impressed with the palace and its setting, the Prussian-born Empress commissioned from Karl Friedrich Schinkel, a Berlin-based architect, a design for a new residence. His design called for a striking combination of Greek Revival and Egyptian Revival elements. The palace was to be perched on the craggy shore in Oreanda. The court architect Andrei Stackenschneider offered a less expensive design, which was adopted. The Tsarina's palace was built between 1843 and 1853 under the supervision of William Hunt and Combioggio, an architect from Odessa. This edifice was destroyed by an 1882 conflagration, with only a marble rotunda remaining. The next emperor, Alexander II, had the royal residence moved to Livadia.

Vorontsov's building activities started a tradition of imperial residency of the area which would attract many of Russia's elite to also build villas and palaces in the Crimea. One of the first such buildings was the Gaspra Palace, designed by William Hunt in the 1830s for Prince Alexander Golitsyn, one of Alexander I's most trusted advisors. Blore's design inspired another straightforward imitation on the eastern shore of the Black Sea: the Dadiani Palace in Zugdidi that was commissioned by the last Princess of Mingrelia in 1873 and, at the time of the Russian Revolution, was in possession of the House of Murat. Neo-Moorish architectural elements were also incorporated in the design of the royal villas in Dulber and Likani.

== Owners and occupiers ==
- Count, later (1845) Prince Mikhail Vorontsov (30 May 1782 – 18 November 1856), Viceroy of New Russia, builder of the palace. He was renowned for his success in the Napoleonic wars. As the Viceroy of the Caucasus from 1844 to 1853, he supervised the conduct of the Caucasian War. Having completed the palace, Vorotsov, now suffering progressive blindness, spent little time there. His commitments to the expanding Russian Empire took him to Tiflis; there, he waged wars on the rebellious local tribes. The now elderly Vorontsov, a confirmed anglophile, was particularly distressed by the outbreak of the Crimean War, which, in England, was heavily promoted by his English nephew, Sidney Herbert. Embarrassed and distressed, he retired from public life to the privacy of Odessa. Vorontsov died in 1856, having lived just long enough to see the signing of the Peace of Paris. Vorontsov's tomb in the Odessa Cathedral was ruined by the Soviets, but his remains survived the Soviet era and were returned to the newly rebuilt cathedral in 2005.
- Countess, later Princess Yelizaveta Vorontsova (19 September 1792 – 27 April 1880), a daughter of Count Franciszek Ksawery Branicki by Aleksandra von Engelhardt, one of the nieces and heiresses of Prince Potemkin, the founder of New Russia (who was childless). She was one of the many Polish noble women who married the Russian aristocrats during the brief period of the "Polish enchantment", when Alexander I publicly conducted an affair with Marie Czetwertyńska and his heir Konstantin was in love with her sister Joanna Wyszkowska. When exiled to the Black Sea coast after The Gabrieliad affair, Alexander Pushkin wooed Elise Vorontsova in Odessa and addressed several poems to her. Apparently resenting his advances, the countess complained to her husband, who had his young rival exiled to a northern village. After her husband's death, Yelizaveta rarely visited the Alupka Palace, preferring to live in Odessa.
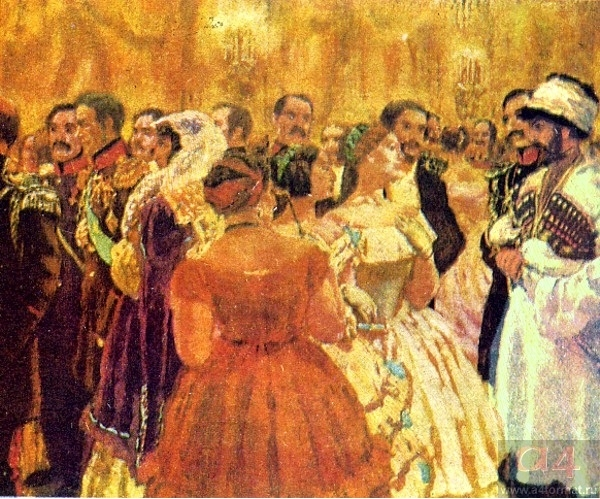
  A gala at Semyon Vorontsov's mansion in Tiflis, by Eugene Lanceray
  - Prince Semyon Vorontsov (23 October 1823 – 6 May 1882), the only son and heir of Prince Mikhail. He served under his father in the Caucasus with distinction and figures in Leo Tolstoy's novella Hadji Murat, as do his wife and father. On 26 August 1851 he married in Alupka, against his parents' wishes, Madame Stolypina, née Princess Trubetskaya, once famed for her radiant beauty. The couple found the cost of running the palace too high, and after making various economies they seldom visited the Crimea. After Semyon's death without issue, the widow plundered the palace of many of its entailed furnishings and paintings and settled at the Avenue du Bois de Boulogne with the Duca di Montelfi, her son from a previous marriage.
  - Countess Sofia Shuvalova (1825–15 August 1879), the daughter of Prince Mikhail and Princess Elizaveta. In 1844, she married Count Andrei Shuvalov, the owner of Pargolovo (not to be confused with another branch of the Shuvalov family whose family seat was the Schloss Ruhenthal in Courland). The marriage was not happy, inducing her to live separately from her husband, who died in the house of another woman in 1876. From the 1850s Sofia and her children used Alupka as a country retreat, occupying the long West Wing now named after them, the Shuvalov Wing, while her brother Prince Semyon occupied the remainder of the palace.
    - Count, later (1882) Prince Pavel Vorontsov-Shuvalov (1846–1885), the son of Sofia Shuvalova and grandson of Mikhail Vorontsov, inherited the largely empty palace and the Vorontsov title on the death of his uncle in 1882. He died three years later. His wife, Yelizaveta Stolypina, née Baroness Pilar von Pilchau, outlived him by 54 years. They had no children. An imperial ukase from 7 July 1882 designated Alupka the centrepiece of the Vorontsov majorat, which was to be inherited in the right of primogeniture.
    - Count Mikhail Shuvalov (7 July 1850 – 5 January 1904) inherited the entailed estate in 1885 from his brother Count Pavel. On 12 February 1886, the Emperor authorized him to use the princely title and to style himself Prince Vorontsov-Shuvalov. He was a bachelor and lived abroad. On his death, the title of Prince Vorontsov (Serene Highness) became extinct.
    - Countess Elizaveta Vorontsova-Dashkova (25 July 1845 – 15 July 1924), the elder sister of Pavel and Mikhail Shuvalov. She was the last private owner of the palace, and restored much of its former splendour, buying back many of its former furnishings, and living quietly there with her husband, Count Illarion Ivanovich Vorontsov-Dashkov, a scion of the only surviving branch of the Vorontsov family. At the beginning of the World War I, Count Illarion was the Governor-General of Caucasus. He died in Alupka in 1916.

Countess Yelizaveta Vorontsova-Dashkova lived in the palace until April 1919. During the great evacuation of the Crimea by the Russian Whites, she sailed to Malta aboard a British ship. She was accompanied by her grandchildren from the Sheremetev family, including Count Nikolai Sheremetev, who later married Princess Irina Yusupova (Bébé). Yelizaveta's descendants also include actress Anne Wiazemsky.

== Later history ==
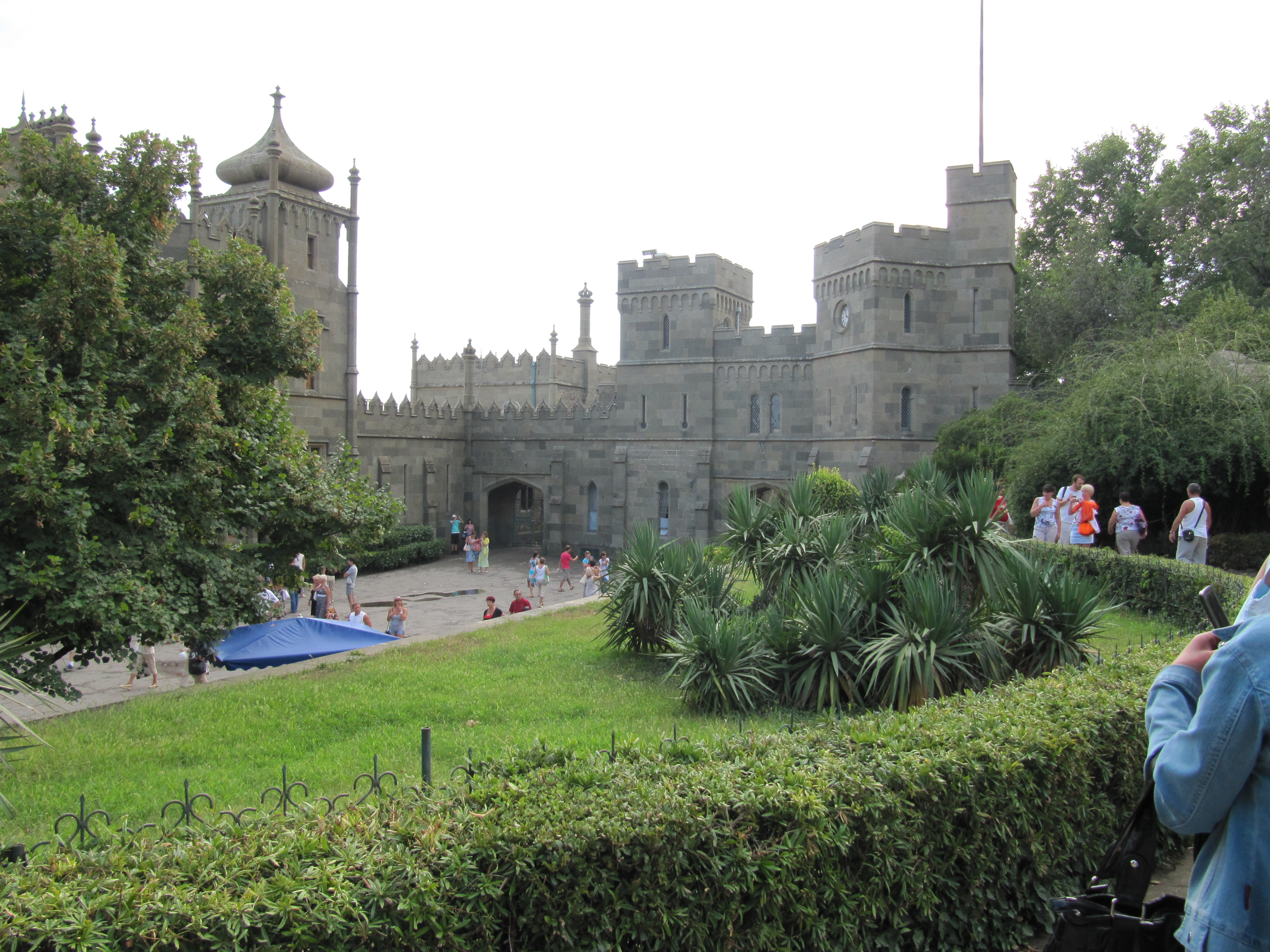
The north forecourt with visiting tourists in 2010.

Four years after the October Revolution, in 1921, the palace was nationalised, after which it was converted into a museum. This occupied the main, dining, and library wings of the building. In addition to the state-confiscated Vorontsov family possessions, the museum also featured the exhibits of the nationalised estates of the Romanovs, Yusupovs, and Stroganovs all of whom had estates in the vicinity. In 1927, the palace's Shuvalov wing housed a sanatorium "10 Years of October," while the palace's main concourse became home to Alupka resort's polyclinic and spa baths.

When the Soviet Union entered World War II in 1941, most of the museum's exhibits were evacuated for safety from Alupka. However, some 537 artistic and graphics exhibits (including temporary exhibition paintings from the State Russian Museum and the Simferopol Art Museum), 360 pieces of the building's decor, sets of unique furniture, and a series of historic books were stolen by occupying Nazi German forces, amounting to a loss of 5 million roubles at the time.

During the war, Adolf Hitler presented the palace as a reward to Field Marshal Erich von Manstein, who made it his personal headquarters. This explains why the palace was so well preserved. The building was later converted into a museum for Wehrmacht officers stationed in and around Crimea. Originally, the Nazis had planned to dynamite the palace during their retreat from Crimea, but the rapid advance of the Separate Coastal Army and supporting Yalta partisan groups during the Crimean Offensive saved the palace from destruction.

From 11 to 14 February 1945, the Yalta Conference took place in the neighbouring, former imperial Livadia Palace; this was between representatives from the United States, the United Kingdom, and the Soviet Union. Winston Churchill and part of his British delegation were given temporary residence within the Vorontsov Palace. Within two weeks, construction workers had restored 22 rooms in the main palace, 23 rooms in the Shuvalov wing, and even replanted the palace gardens. The palace's English-inspired architectural style gained praise from Churchill himself: Churchill was so taken by the garden's Medici lions that he later asked Stalin if he could take them home; Stalin declined the request.

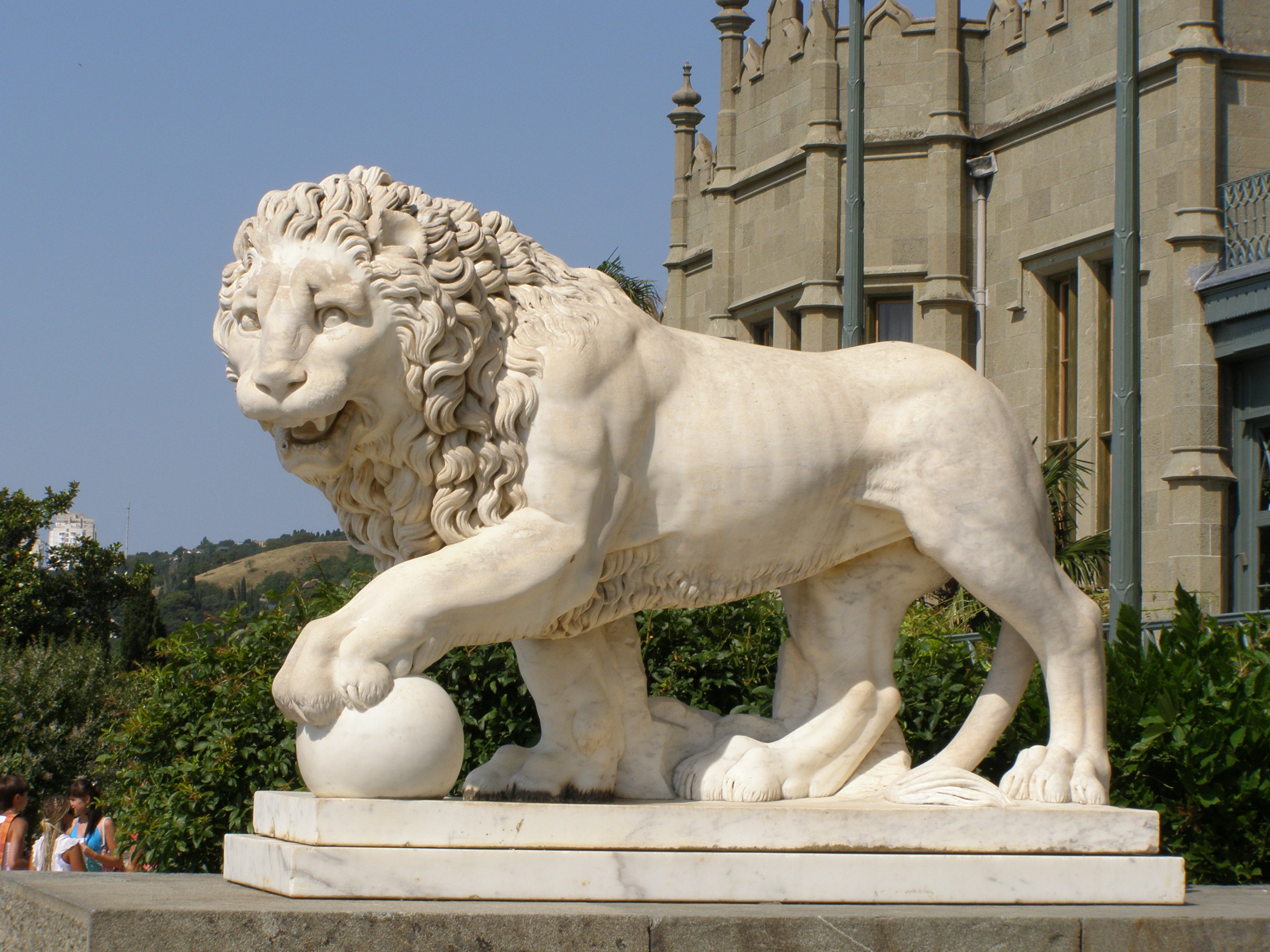
One of the Medici lions so admired by Churchill

The setting of our abode was impressive ... Behind the villa, half Gothic and half Moorish in style, rose the mountains, covered in snow, culminating in the highest peak in the Crimea. Before us lay the dark expanse of the Black Sea, severe, but still agreeable and warm even at this time of the year. Carved white lions guarded the entrance to the house, and beyond the courtyard lay a fine park with sub-tropical plants and cypresses.

— Winston Churchill, Triumph and Tragedy: The Second World War, Vol 6, 1953

Following the war, the palace was used as a summer retreat for the Soviet secret police, and later as a trade sanatorium. In 1956, the palace was once again reinstated as a museum, and two years later, it was further expanded by art treasures. However, the majority of the artwork looted during the war was never recovered, only a small fragment of the former collection was returned to the museum. In 1965, the palace was incorporated into the "Alupka Palace-Park Complex," a national historical preserve which also includes the Massandra Palace in neighboring Massandra, built in the Louis XIII château style for Tsar Alexander III.

Although it had survived years of wear and warfare, in 2000, one of the palace's wings was considered in danger of collapsing into the Black Sea below, according to The Daily Telegraph. Cracks had begun to appear in the library, housing almost 10,000 books and manuscripts. Although Edward Blore had a state-of-the-art drainage system built into the palace's foundation, years of neglect, Coastal erosion and the construction of a nearby sewage pipe in 1974 have helped to increase the potential for a landslide. Another potential looming disaster was surrounding the medieval-style gatehouse near the palace's west side.

== See also ==
- Vorontsov Palace (disambiguation), list of similarly named palaces built for the Vorontsov family
- List of historic reserves in Ukraine
