= Abbey College, Ramsey =

Abbey College
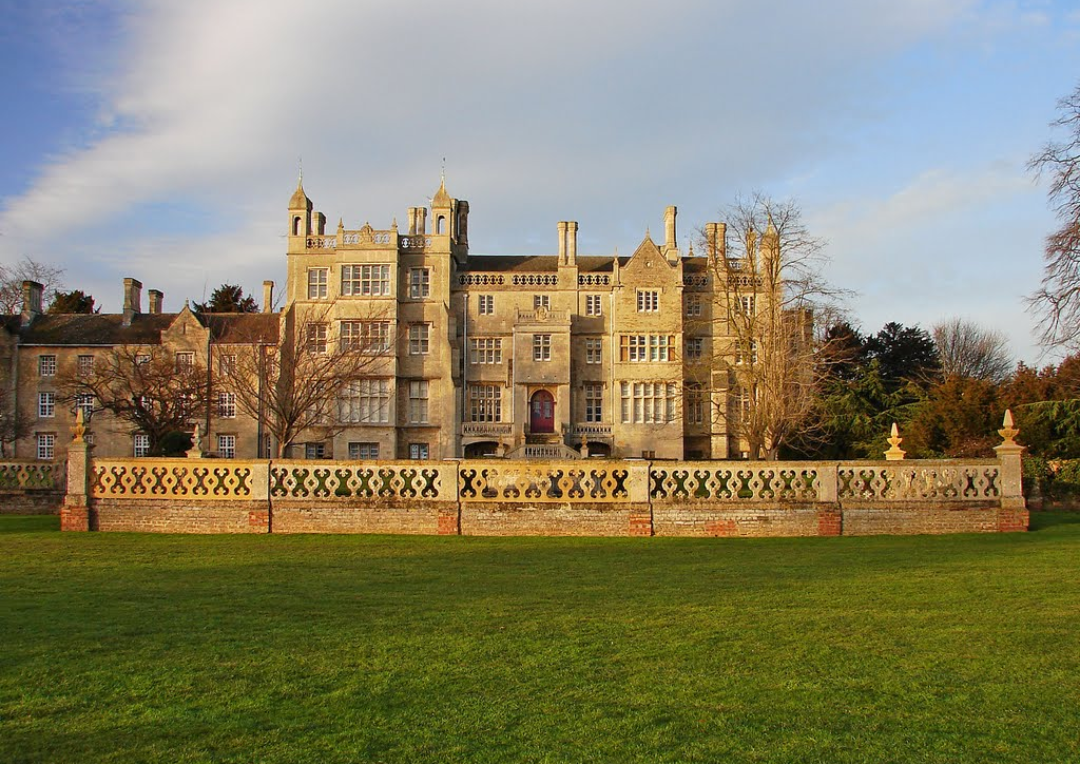

Location
- Abbey Road; Ramsey, Cambridgeshire, PE26 1DG; England; 52°26′51″N 0°05′51″W

Information
- Motto: HIP (Humility, Intuition, Passion)
- Established: 2006
- Local authority: Cambridgeshire
- Department for Education URN: 137377 Tables
- Ofsted: Reports
- Head teacher: Andy Christoforou
- Age: 11 to 18
- Enrolment: 1,011
- Houses: 4 Green (Churchill); Yellow (Da Vinci); Blue (Hawking); Red (Woolf)
- Colours: Red (Year 7); Blue (Year 8); White (Year 9); Green (Year 10); Yellow (Year 11)
- Website: www.abbeycollege.cambs.sch.uk

Abbey College is a secondary school located in Ramsey, Cambridgeshire, England. The school is around 10 miles from Huntingdon and Peterborough and offers education for 11-18 year olds in its surroundings town/areas. 1011 students attend the school (capacity only at 1250). In 2020 the school appeared in the local news due to teachers at Abbey College attaching head and shoulder photographs of more than 110 sixth-form students to a board now nicknamed the "shame board" by students due to its ranking of "effort and progress into work" and appeared once again in 2023 after allegations against a teacher.

== History ==
=== Grammar school ===
The school was the former Ramsey Abbey Grammar School. Also in Ramsey was the Ailwyn Secondary Modern School.

=== Comprehensive school ===
In 2006, Ailwyn Community College and Ramsey Abbey School joined into a single school, Abbey college. The building had been active for centuries before the school had even been founded due to being a monastery founded by monks, whereas The Ailwyn was founded in the 1950s.

On 1 September 2011, the school officially gained academy status. Also in 2011, the school was labelled by Ofsted as "A good school with outstanding features". In both 2014 & 2016, it was labelled as "Requires Improvement." In 2018, the school re-obtained the status of "Good" from Ofsted.

More information about the Abbey here: Ramsey Abbey

== Notable former pupils ==
- Charlotte Edwards, cricketer, captain of the England women's team

=== Ramsey Abbey Grammar School ===
- Robbie Gibb, director of communications from 2017-19 for the prime minister
- Sir Richard Barnett (economist) vice-chancellor from 2006-15 of Ulster University
- Charles Joy, attended from 1923–28, became the chief designer of Handley Page from 1953 to 1968, being responsible for the Handley Page Jetstream aircraft
