= List of honorary graduates of the University of Leeds =

This list of Honorary Graduates of the University of Leeds is a year-by-year list of people recognized by the University of Leeds for their achievements in their given field with an honorary award.

An honorary degree or a degree honoris causa (Latin: 'for the sake of the honour') is an academic degree for which a university (or other degree-awarding institution) has waived the usual requirements (such as matriculation, residence, study and the passing of examinations). The degree itself is typically a doctorate or, less commonly, a master's degree, and may be awarded to someone who has no prior connection with the academic institution.

Key
DEng	Doctor of Engineering
DLitt	Doctor of Letters
DM	Doctor of Medicine
DMus	Doctor of Music
DSc	Doctor of Science
LLD	Doctor of Laws

== 2020s ==
2026

- Ed Anderson (LLD)
- Peter Cheney (DSc)
- Susan Cheney (DSc)
- Ellie Kildunne (LLD)
- Tina Leslie (LLD)
- Rachel Lord (LLD)
- Steve Rosenberg (LLD)

2025

- Judith Blake (Baroness Blake of Leeds) (LLD)
- Steph Houghton (LLD)
- Khadijah Ibrahiim (DLitt)
- Jack Maitland (LLD)

2024

- Peter Buckley (LLD)
- Alan Langlands (LLD)
- Kevin Sinfield (LLD)
- Mark Gatiss (LLD)

2023

- Anita Rani (DLitt)
- Ondrej Krivanek (DSc)

2022

- Nina Gualinga (LLD)
- Mark Tucker (LLD)
- Brenda Hale (LLD)
- David Gray (LLD)
- Eleanor Dodson (DSc)
- Alison Lowe (LLD)
- Rachel Skinner (LLD)
- Gillian Leng (DSc)

No honorary degrees were awarded in 2020 or 2021 due to the COVID-19 pandemic.

== 2010s ==
2019

- Peter Dhillon (LLD)
- Jane Featherstone (DLitt)
- Richard Henderson (DSc)
- Lubaina Himid (DLitt)
- Michael Pepper (DEng)
- Norman Williams (DSc)

2018

- Kenton Cool (LLD)
- Mary Fowler (DSc)
- Peter Gibbs (LLD)
- Gabriele Hegerl (DSc)
- Alice Roberts (DSc)
- Jane Rumble (DSc)
- Clare Marx (DSc)
- Wendy Burn (DM)
- Robert Mair, Baron Mair (DEng)
- Iain Mattaj (DSc)
- David Olusoga (DLitt)
- Anne Owers (LLD)
- Christopher Senyonjo (LLD)
- Leslie Valiant (DEng)

2017

- Malcolm Brown (LLD)
- Anne Chamberlain (DSc)
- Grace Clough (LLD)
- Barry Cryer (DLitt)
- Karen Darke (LLD)
- Richard Farnes (DMus)
- John Hardy (DSc)
- Colin Low (Baron Low of Dalston) (LLD)
- Nicola Mendelsohn (LLD)
- Helen Rappaport (DLitt)
- Martin Rees (Baron Rees of Ludlow) (DSc)
- Andrew Shovlin (DEng)
- Paul Workman (DSc)

2016

- Athene Donald (DSc)
- John Fisher (DEng)
- Anne-Marie Hutchinson (LLD)
- Steve Jackson (DSc)
- Vivien Jones (DLitt)
- Wayne McGregor (DLitt)
- Peter Morgan (DLitt)
- Isobel Pollock-Hulf (DEng)
- Julia Slingo (DSc)
- John Stoddart-Scott (LLD)
- Andrea Sutcliffe (DSc)

2015

- Nicola Adams (LLD)
- Simon Armitage (DLitt)
- David Baulcombe (DSc)
- Margaret Jull Costa (DLitt)
- Ann Dowling (DEng)
- Arthur France (LLD)
- Peter Hendy (LLD)
- Howard Morris (DSc)
- Michelle Pinggera (LLD)
- John Tooke (DSc)

2014

- Michael Arthur (LLD)
- John Dyson, Lord Dyson (LLD)
- Jane Francis (DSc)
- Andras Schiff (DMus)
- Patrick Stewart (DLitt)

2013

- Alistair Brownlee (LLD)
- Jonathan Brownlee (LLD)
- Claire Cashmore (LLD)
- Stephanie Flanders (DLitt)
- Samuel Kargbo (DSc)
- Linda Pollard (LLD)
- Susan Solomon (DSc)
- Martin Wainwright (DLitt)

2012

- Onora O’Neill (LLD)
- Eliza Manningham-Buller (LLD)
- Keir Starmer QC (LLD)
- Ian Kershaw (DLitt)

2011

- David Stuart (DSc)
- Corinne Bailey Rae (DMus)
- Jonathan Wild (LLD)
- Sally Davies (DM)
- Peter Blake (DMus)
- Keith Howard (LLD)

2010

- Alan Yentob (LLD)
- José Ángel Gurría (LLD)
- Elaine Surick Oran (DSc)
- Ingrid Roscoe (LLD)
- John Sentamu (LLD)
- John Simpson (LLD)
- Lesley Dixon (LLD)
- Sir Stuart Rose (LLD)

== 2000s ==
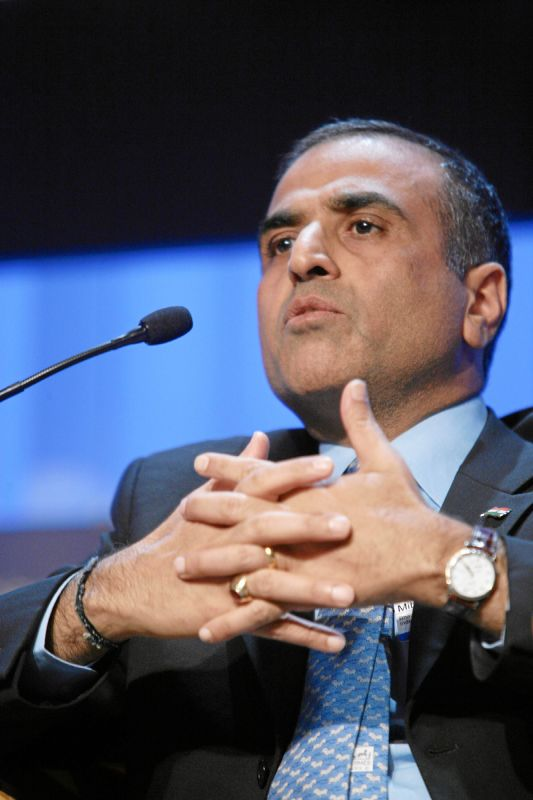
Sunil Mittal, honoured in 2009

2009

- Sayyid Saud bin Ibrahim Al-Busaidi (LLD)
- Yahya bin Saud bin Mansoor Al-Sulaimi (LLD)
- Nicola Brewer (LLD)
- Malcolm Chaikin (DSc)
- Bekele Geleta (LLD)
- Simon Mason (LLD)
- Sunil Bharti Mittal (LLD)
- Richard Mantle (DMus)
- Michael Nyman (DMus)
- Lord Oxburgh of Liverpool (DSc)
- Peter Robinson (DLitt)

2008

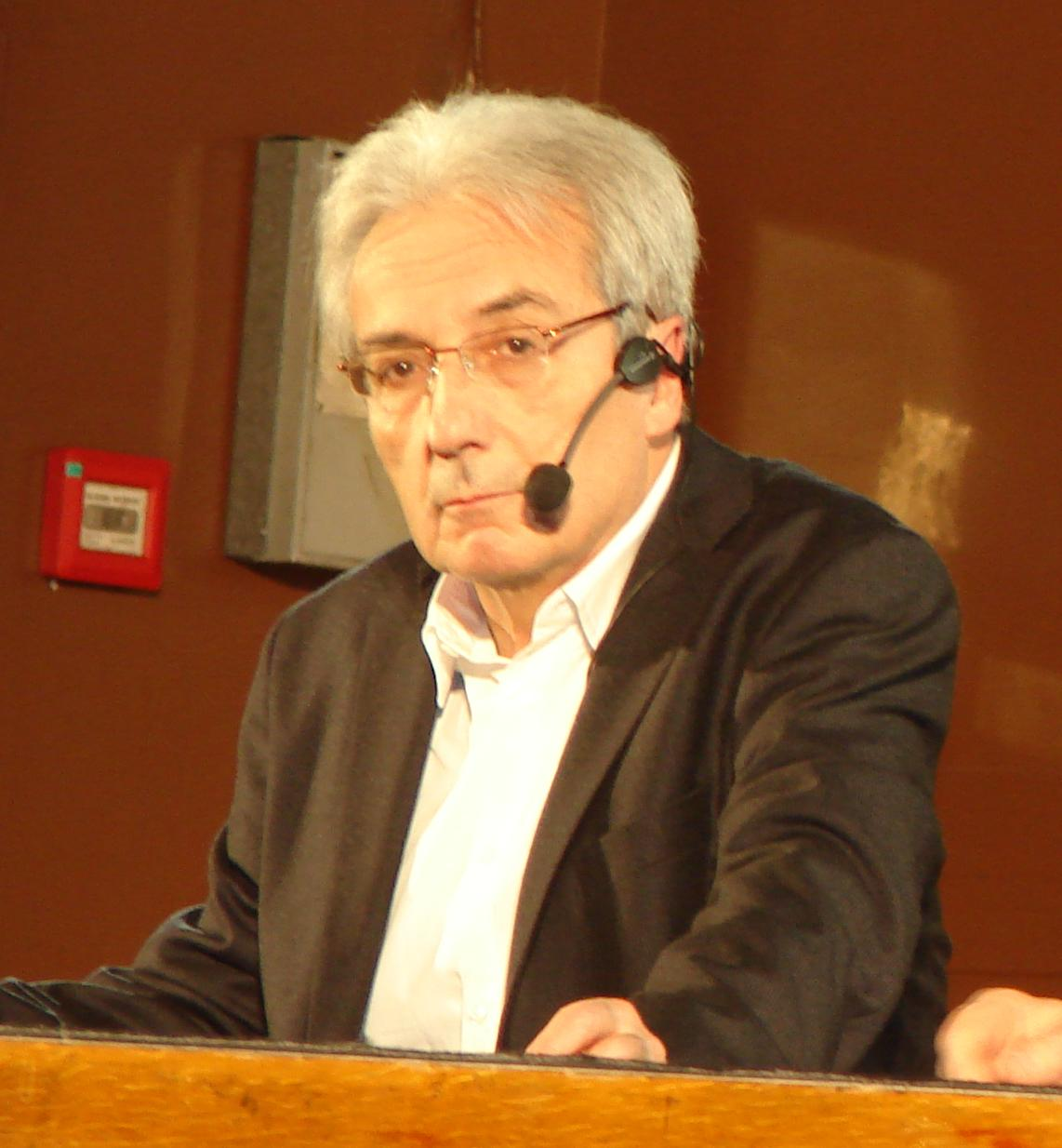
Albert Fert, honoured in 2008

- Mark Byford (LLD)
- Albert Fert (DSc)
- Baroness Flather (LLD)
- David Hessayon (DSc)
- Sir Christopher Rose (LLD)
- Martin Scicluna (LLD)
- Polly Toynbee (LLD)

2007

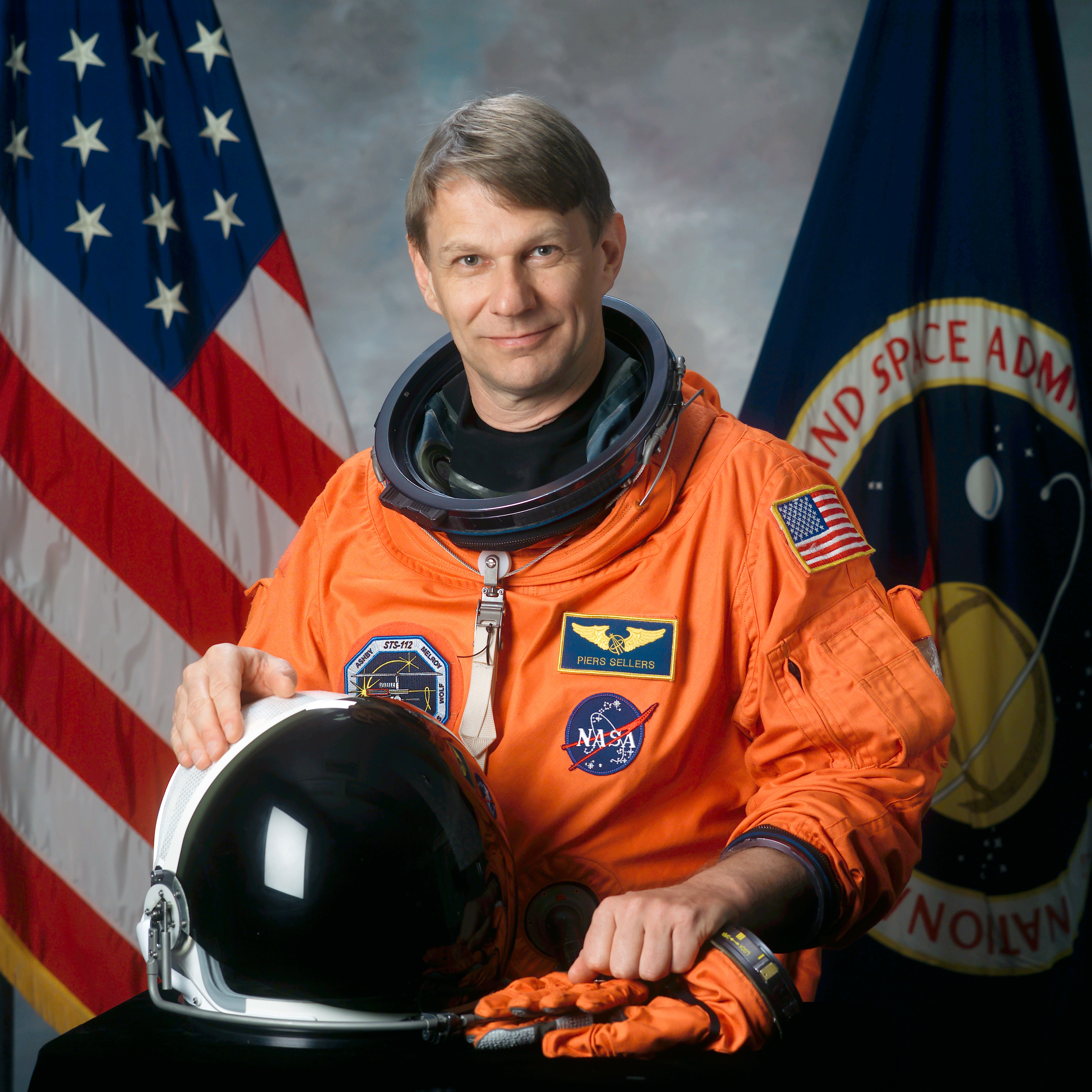
Dr. Piers Sellers, honoured in 2007

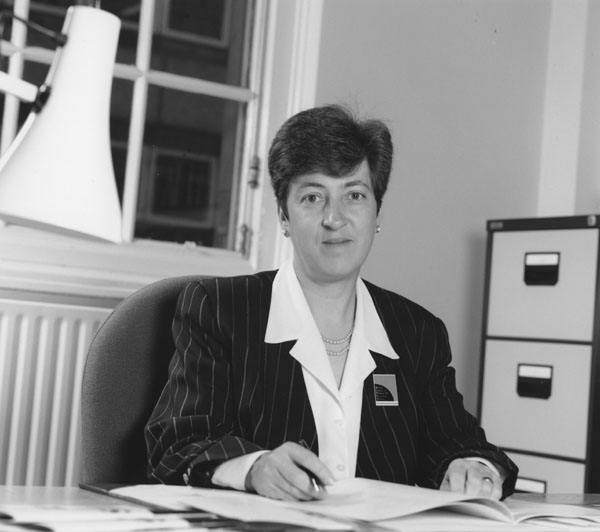
Lynne Brindley honoured in 2006

- David Ansbro (LLD)
- Dame Josephine Barstow (DMus)
- Steve Bell (DLitt)
- Dr Sydney Brenner (DM)
- Arthur Cockcroft (LLD)
- Anita Desai (DLitt)
- Ruth Errington (LLD)
- Al Garthwaite (LLD)
- Mabel Parris (LLD)
- Harold Pinter (DLitt)
- Dr Piers Sellers (DSc)
- Professor Janet Thornton (DSc)
- Fiona Wood (DM)
- Tony Wren (DEng)

2006

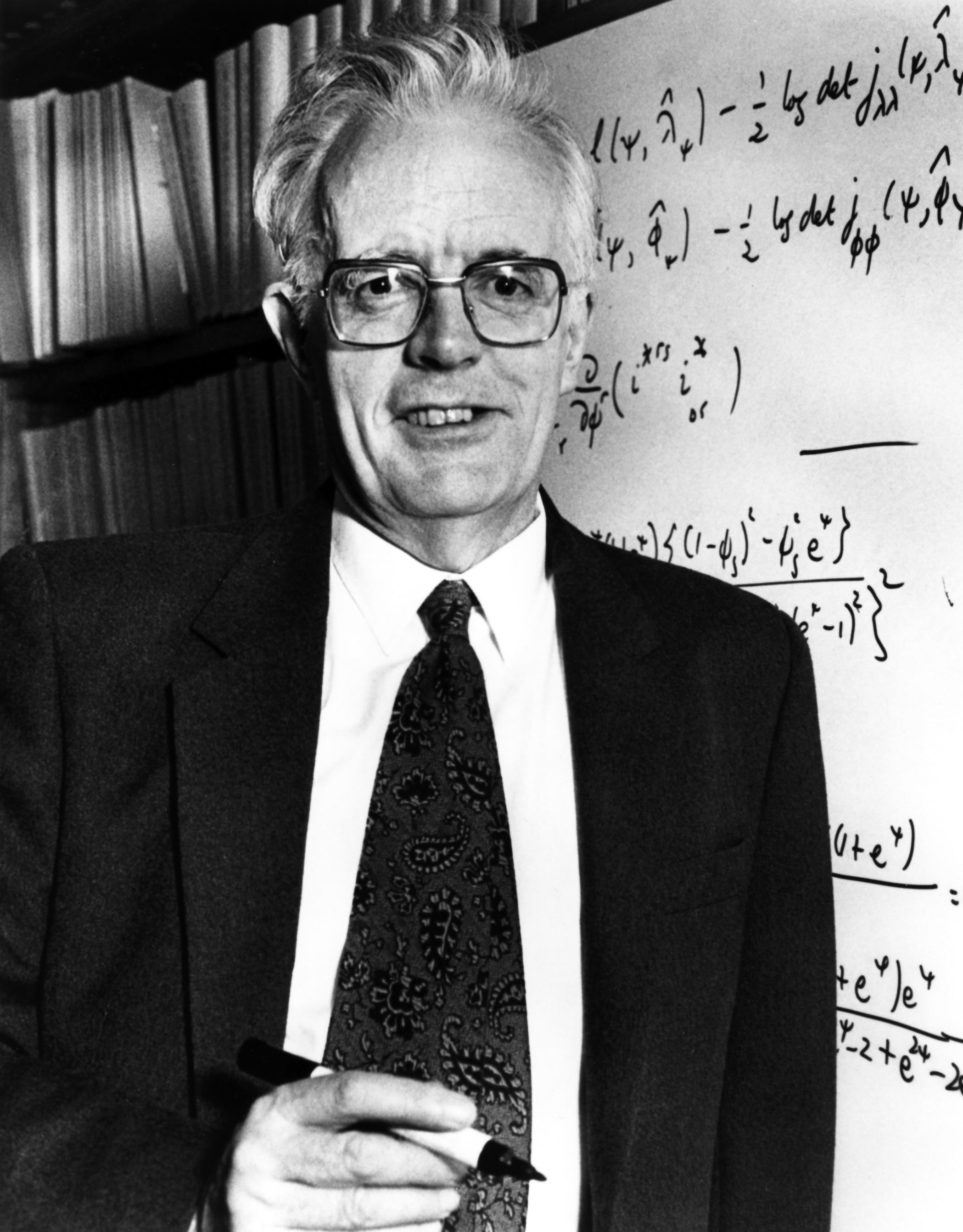
Sir David Cox, honoured in 2005

- Lynne Brindley (DLitt)
- Gurinder Chadha (DLitt)
- Sara Courtneidge (DSc)
- John Elderfield (DLitt)
- Alexander Markham (DSc)
- Arthur Stone (LLD)

2005

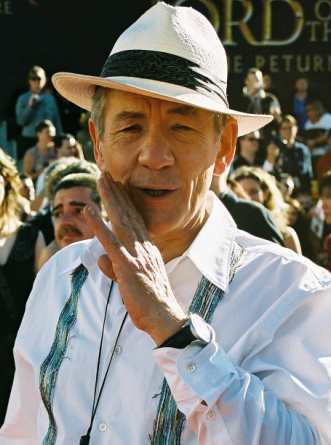
Sir Ian McKellen honoured in 2004

- Bill Bryson (DLitt)
- Sir David Cox (DSc)
- Andy Kershaw (DMus)
- Dame Nancy Rothwell (DSc)
- Marjorie Ziff (LLD)

2004

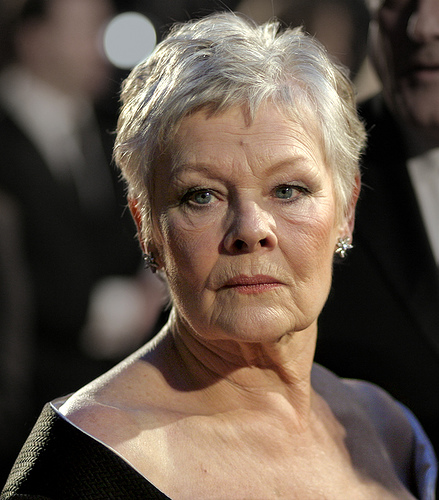
Dame Judi Dench honoured in 2002

- Zygmunt Bauman (Emeritus Professor)
- Maurice Beresford (Emeritus Professor)
- Jack Charlton (LLD)
- Duncan Dowson (Emeritus Professor)
- Tony Harrison (DLitt)
- Professor Dame Julia Higgins (DSc)
- Sir Ian McKellen (DLitt)
- Sir Kenneth Morrison (LLD)
- Baroness Usha Prashar (LLD)
- Professor David Rhodes (DEng)
- Ngugi wa Thiong'o (DLitt)
- Professor Sir Alan Wilson (LLD)

2003

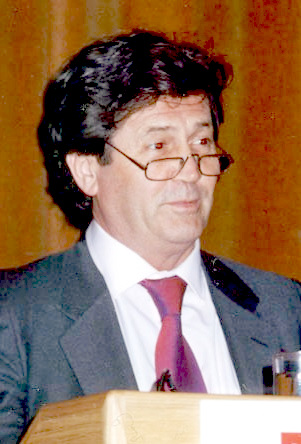
Lord Melvyn Bragg honoured in 2000

- Anthony Hunt (DEng)
- Caryl Phillips (DLitt)

2002

- Dame Judi Dench (DLitt)
- Roderic Lyne (LLD)
- Paul Nurse (DSc)

2001

- Dame Betty Boothroyd (LLD)
- Susan Greenfield (DSc)
- Seamus Heaney (DLitt)
- Craig Jordan (DMed)

2000

- Melvyn Bragg (DLitt)
- Alan Bullock (DLitt)
- Jocelyn Bell Burnell (DSc)
- David Hockney (Dlitt)
- Jude Kelly (DLitt)
- Robert Ogden (LLD)
- Alan Roberts (LLD)

== 1990s ==
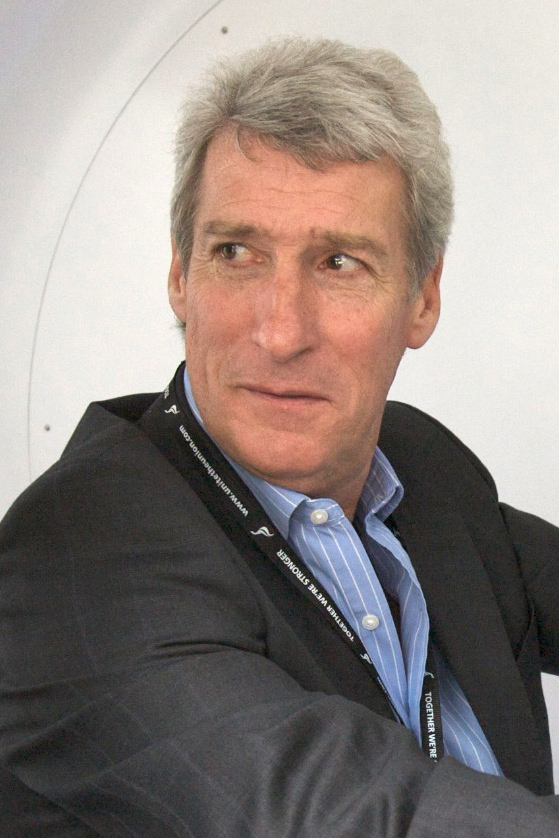
Jeremy Paxman, honoured in 1999

1999

- Jeremy Paxman (LLD)
- Murray Perahia (DMus)
- Jack Straw (LLD)
- Professor Sir John Ernest Walker (DSc)

1998

- No honors conferred in this academic year.

1997

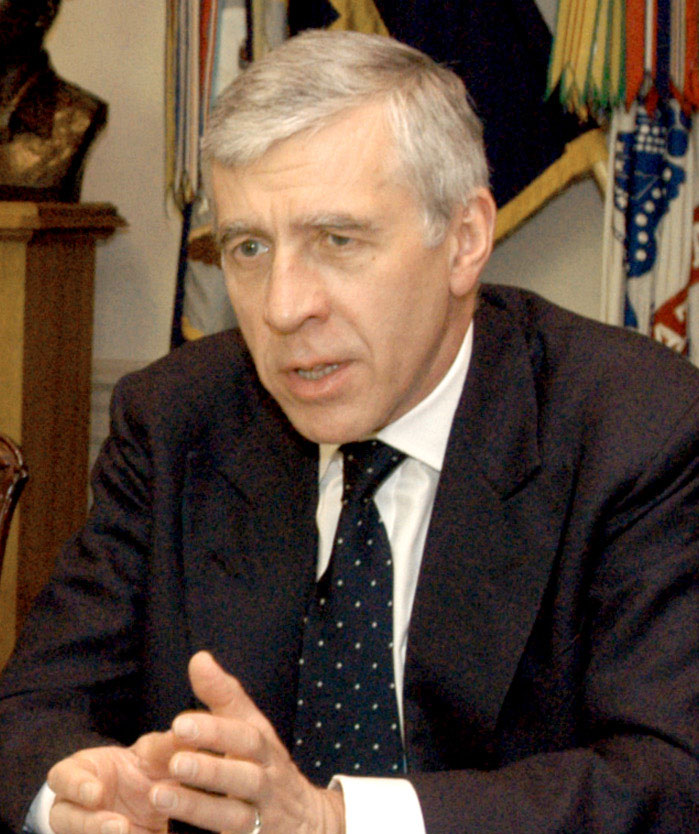
Jack Straw, honoured in 1999

- Harold 'Dickie' Bird (LLD)
- Ben Gill (DSc)
- Peter Gray (DSc)
- John Hougham (LLD)
- Douglas Jefferson (DLitt)
- Bill Kilgallon (LLD)
- Gerald Di Piazza (DEng)
- Derek Roberts (DSc)
- Nayantara Saghal (DLitt)
- Richard Sykes (DSc)

1996

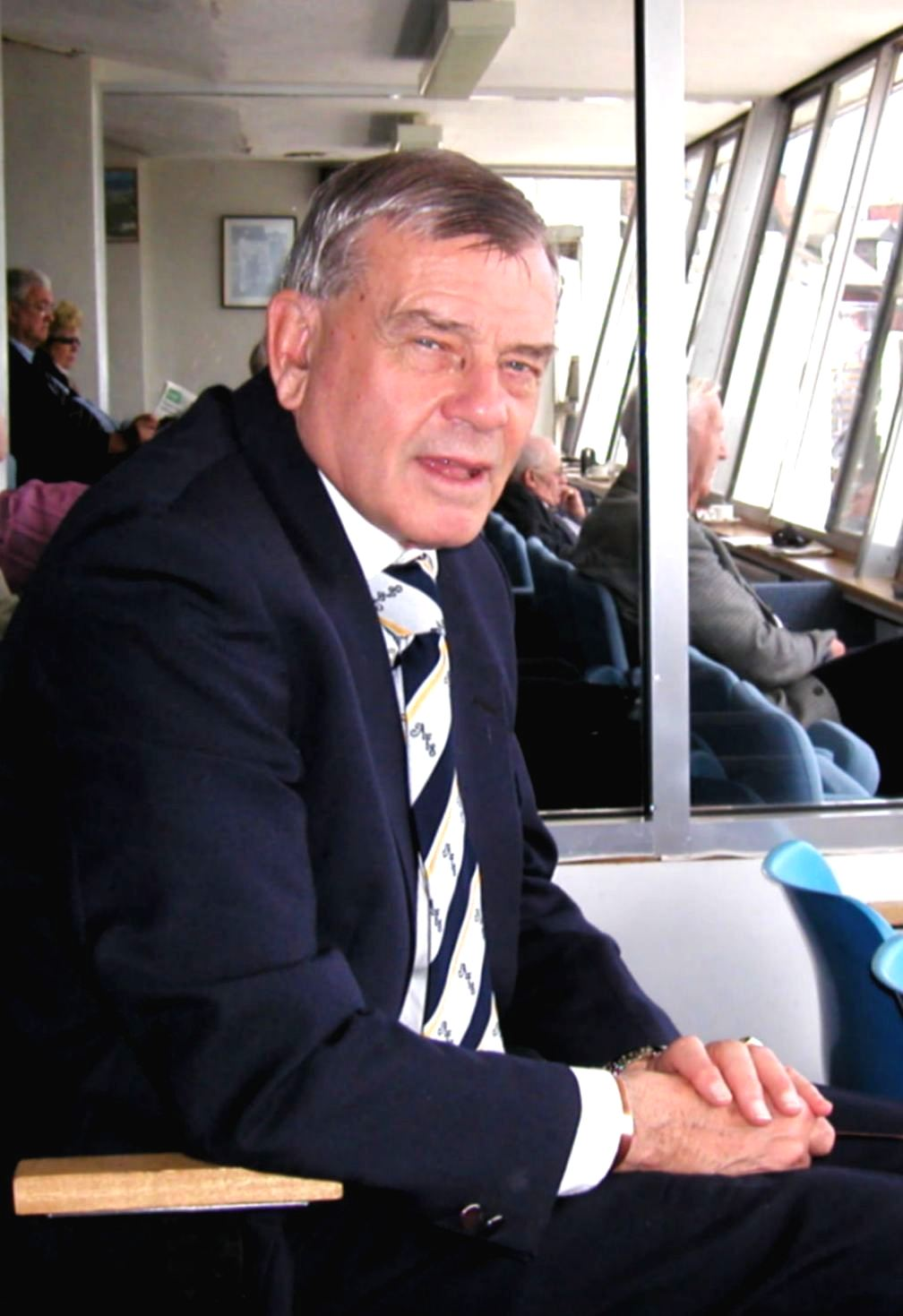
Harold 'Dickie' Bird, honoured in 1997

- James Cronin (DSc)
- Vigdís Finnbogadóttir (LLD)
- Ernest Hall (LLD)
- David Jenkins (DD)
- Sir Jonathan Wolfe Miller (DLitt)
- Dame Kathleen Raven (LDD)
- Ismail Zawawi (DEng)

1995

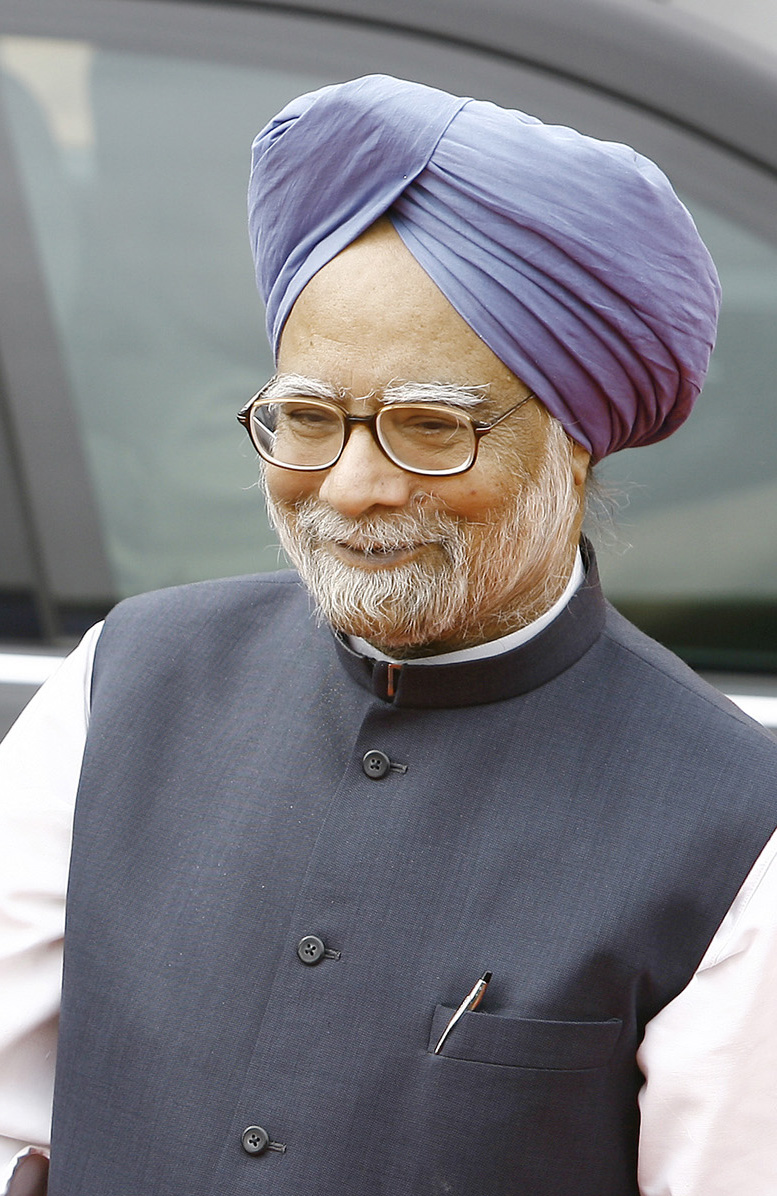
Manmohan Singh, honoured in 1995

- Sir Alan Bowness (DLitt)
- Stuart Hall (DLitt)
- Sir John Houghton (DSc)
- Tom Jackson (LLD)
- Mark Knopfler (DMus)
- Professor Sir Hans Leo Kornberg (DSc)
- Lin Ma (LLD)
- Jean Muir (DLitt)
- Manmohan Singh (LLD)
- Lord Justice Taylor, Baron Taylor of Gosforth (LLD)
- Chad Varah (LLD)

1994

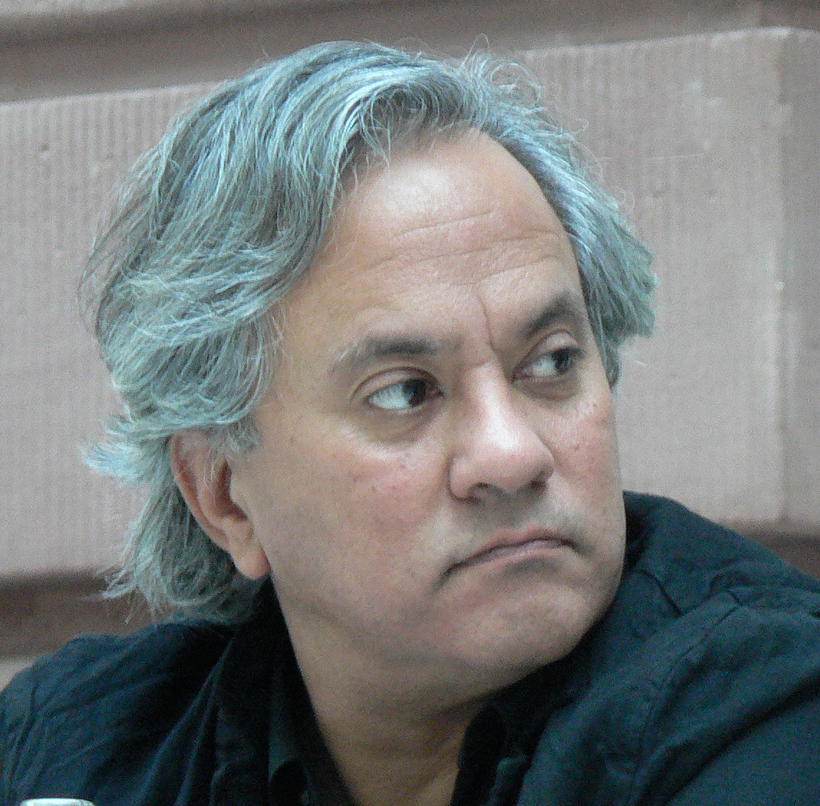
Anish Kapoor, honoured in 1993

- Emeka Anyaoku (LLD)
- Margaret Atwood (DLitt)
- Lydia Dunn, Baroness Dunn (LLD)
- Sir Sam Edwards (DSc)
- Professor Sir Gordon Higginson (LLD)
- Raymond George Hardenbergh Seitz (LLD)
- Cecil Thompson (MA)
- Victor Watson (LLD)

1993

- Rev (Albert) Kenneth Cragg (DD)
- Maurice Godet (DEng)
- Anish Kapoor (DLitt)
- Dame Anne Laura Dorinthea McLaren (DSc)
- Sir Simon Denis Rattle (DMus)
- Edward Thompson (DLitt)
- Dr. James Walsh (LLD)
- Arnold Ziff (LLD)

1992

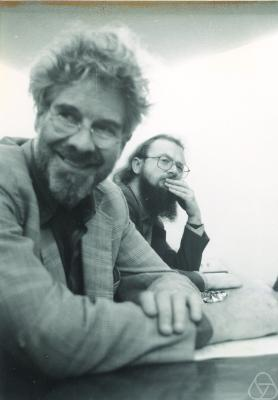
Sir Erik Christopher Zeeman, honoured in 1990

- Sir Charles Frank (DSc)
- Professor Stephen Jay Gould (DSc)
- Raymond Head (LLD)
- Prince Sadruddin Aga Khan (LLD)
- Professor Dan McKenzie (DSc)
- Cristopher Mowll (LLD)
- David Terence Puttnam, Baron Puttnam (DLitt)
- Merlyn Rees, Baron Merlyn-Rees (LLD)
- Dame Enid Diana Elizabeth Rigg (DLitt)
- Dame Fanny Waterman (DMus)

1991

- Denis Healey, Baron Healey (LLD)
- Rev. Trevor Huddlestone (LLD)
- Professor Walter Kunzel (DM)
- Sir Gordon Linacre (LDD)
- Janusz Onyszkiewicz (DSc)
- Pat Solk (LLD)
- Sir Peter Thompson (LLD)

1990

- Alan Bennett (DLitt)
- Barbara Taylor Bradford (DLitt)
- Lt Cdr. Allan Crockatt (LDD)
- Ray Cullingworth (MA)
- Ralph Goodall (DEng)
- Professor Yves Jeannin (DSc)
- Sir Gustav Victor Joseph Nossal (DM)
- Colin Sampson (LLD)
- Tōru Takemitsu (DMus)
- Sir Erik Christopher Zeeman (DSc)

== 1980s ==
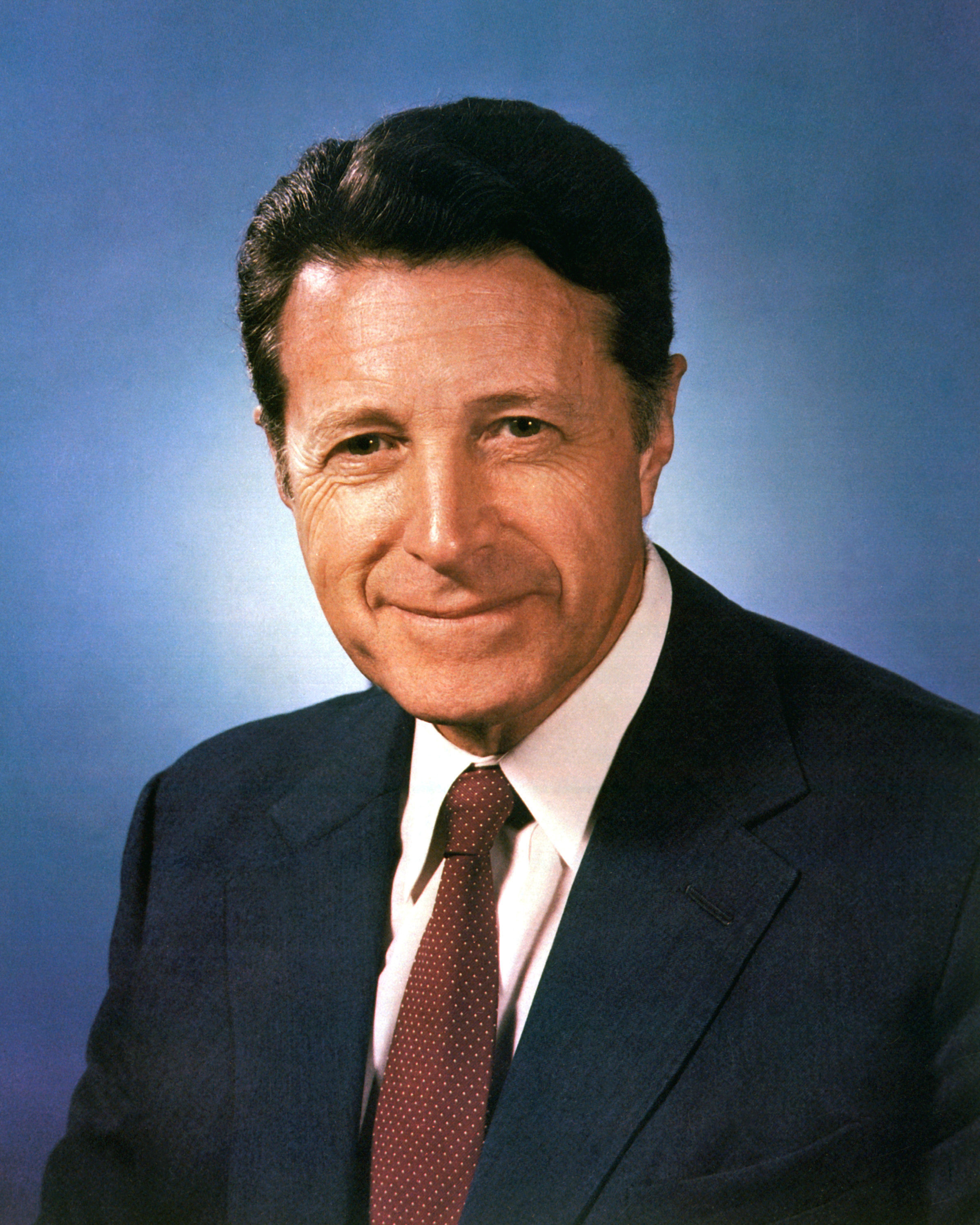
Caspar Weinberger, honoured in 1989

1989

- Joseph Dickinson (MSc)
- Sir Joseph Gilbert (LLD)
- H Peter Jost (DEng)
- Professor Heinrich Noth (DSc)
- Tan Sri Rashdan (LLD)
- Esther Simpson (LLD)
- Caspar Weinberger (DM)

1988

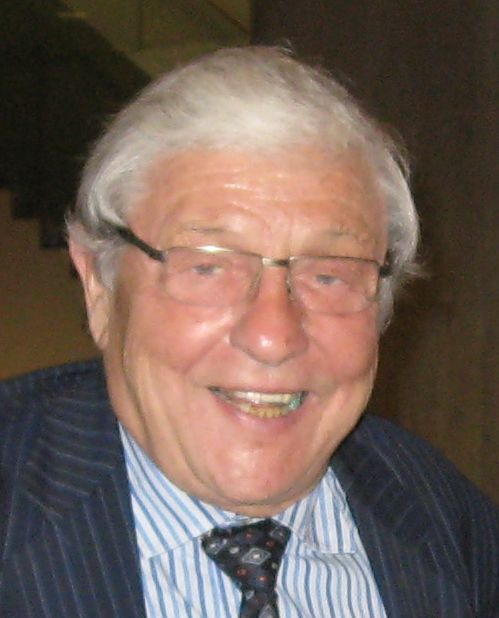
Roy McMurtry, honoured in 1988

- Doreen J Bayley (MA)
- Professor Richard Cobb (DLitt)
- Geoffrey Hill (DLitt)
- Susan Cunliffe-Lister, Dowager Countess of Swinton, Baroness Masham of Ilton (LLD)
- Roy McMurtry (LLD)
- Patricia Ruanne (DLitt)
- William P Thackray (LLD)
- Jean M Tyrrell (LLD)
- Professor Sir David Weatherall (DM)

1987

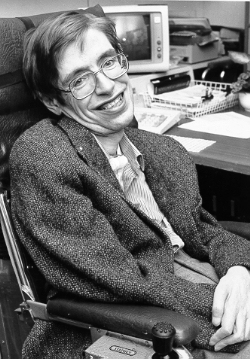
Professor Stephen Hawking, honoured in 1987

- Jack Ashley, Baron Ashley of Stoke (LLD)
- Sir Alan Ayckbourn (DLitt)
- Sir Lawrence Byford (LLD)
- Bernard Haitink (DMus)
- Professor Stephen Hawking (DSc)
- Professor Jerzy Kroh (DSc)
- Yves Lesage (LLD)
- Anthony J Moyes (LLD)
- Dame Margaret Kate Weston (DSc)

1986

- Professor Sir Geoffrey Allen (DSc)
- Reverend Professor William Owen Chadwick (DLitt)
- Janusz Fibras (DLitt)
- David Lloyd-Jones (DMus)
- Sir David Lean (DLitt)
- Sir James Wilson Vincent Savile (LLD) – revoked 2012
- Noel Stockdale (LLD)

1985

- Douglas Gabb (MEng)
- Emeritus Professor Irene Manton (DSc)
- Ronald King Murray, Lord Murray (LLD)
- John Piper (DLitt)
- Professor Robert Shackleton (DLitt)
- Douglas Shortridge (LLD)
- Rev. Gordon Wheeler (DD)
- Xie Xide (DSc)

1984

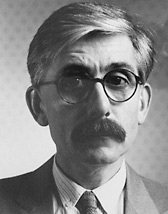
Roy Colin Strong, honoured in 1983

- Julian Bream (DMus)
- Professor Brian Leonard Clarkson (DSc)
- Richard Arthur Dalley (MSc)
- James Hanson, Baron Hanson (LLD)
- Sir Paul Leonard Fox (LLD)
- Sir Stanley George Hooker (DSc)
- Syed Ali Mohammed Husain Khusro (LLD)
- Emeritus Professor Owen Lattimore (DLitt)
- Sir James Lighthill (DSc)
- Sir Rex Richards (DSc)
- R. E. Rowe (DEng)
- Margaret Susan Cheshire, Baroness Ryder of Warsaw and Baroness Cheshire (LLD)
- Emeritus Professor William Walsh (LLD)
- James Westoll (LLD)

1983

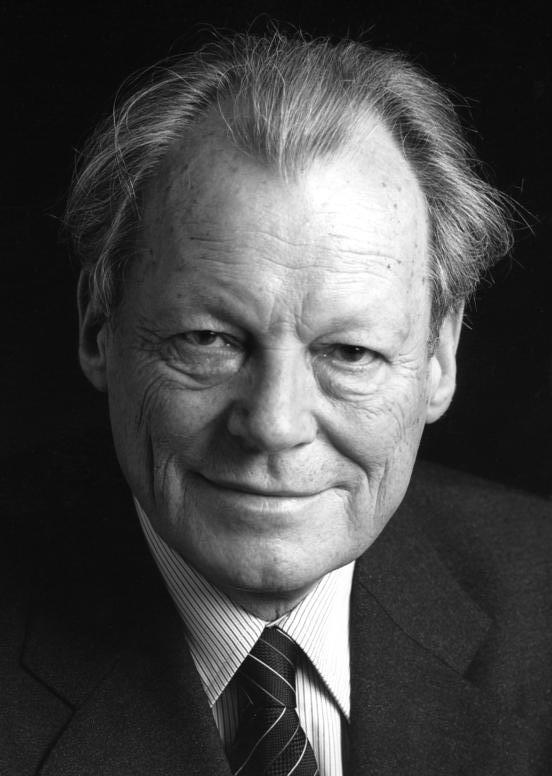
Willy Brandt, honoured in 1982

- Imogen Clare Holst (DMus)
- George Thomas, 1st Viscount Tonypandy of Rhondda (LLD)
- Robert Stewart Rowe (DLitt)
- Roy Colin Strong (DLitt)

1982

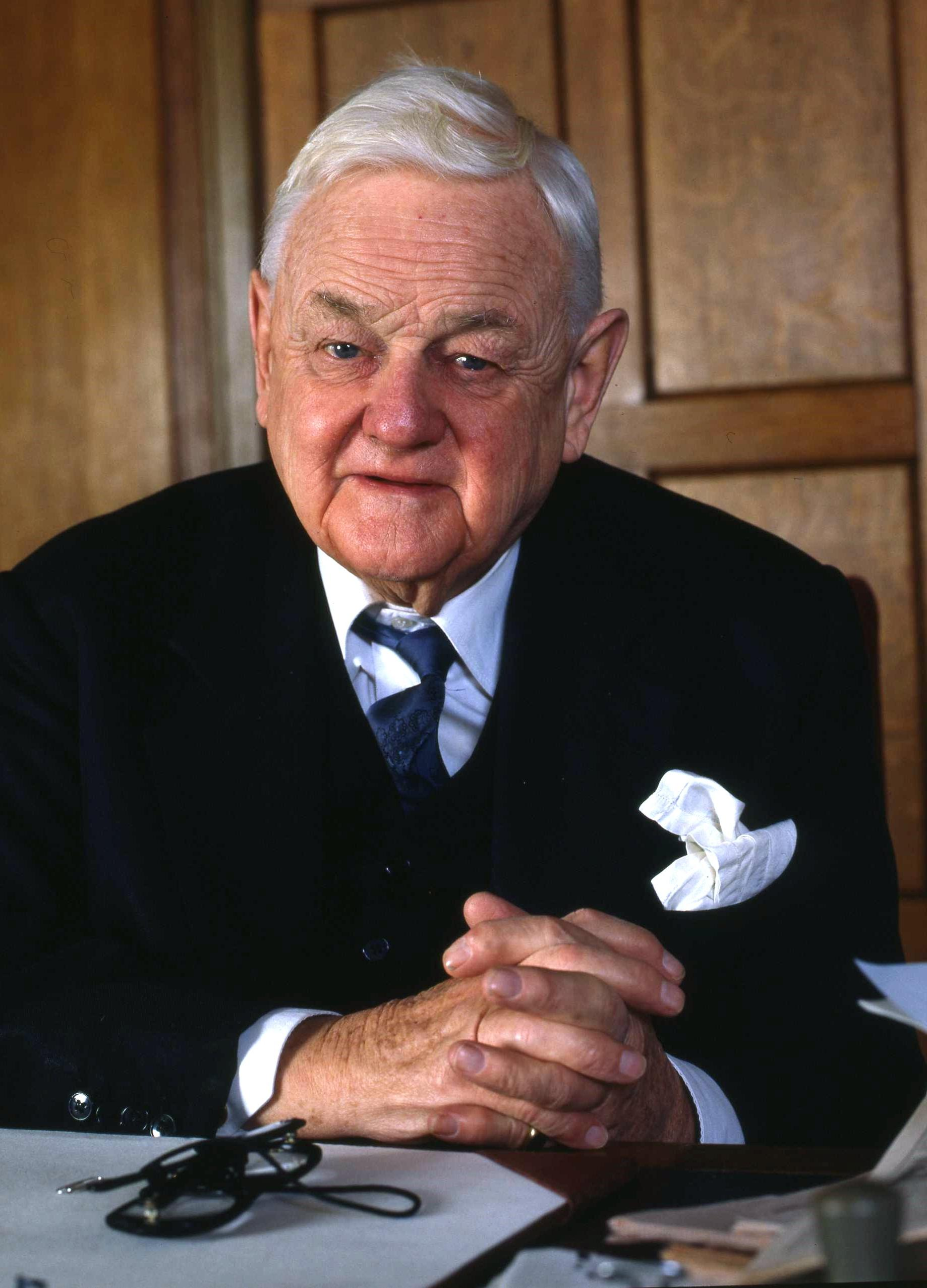
Quintin Hogg, Baron Hailsham of St Marylebone, honoured in 1982

- Stephen Towers Anning (MPhil)
- Willy Brandt (LLD)
- Denis Parsons Burkitt
- Sir Henry Chilver, Baron Chilver (DSc)
- Jacqueline du Pré (DMus)
- Derek Ezra, Baron Ezra (LLD)
- Quintin Hogg, Baron Hailsham of St Marylebone (LLD)
- Ronald Stanley Illingworth (DSc)
- Leo Arthur Kaprio (LLD)
- Emmanuel Le Roy Ladurie (DLitt)
- Sir Rudolph Lyons (LLD)

1981

- Peter Carington, 6th Baron Carrington (LLD)
- Professor David Donnison (LLD)
- Sarah Gilchrist (MA)
- Robert Gittings (DLitt)
- Jean Philippe Inebnit (MA)
- Sir Alec Merrison (DSc)
- Richard Morris (DSc)
- Norah Smallwood (DLitt)

1980

- Dame Janet Abbott Baker (DMus)
- Reverend Henry Chadwick (DD)
- John Cedric Goligher (DSc)
- James MacGregor (LLD)
- Sir Denis Rooke (DSc)
- Sir Tom Stoppard (DLitt)
- Shirley Williams, Baroness Williams of Crosby (LLD)

== 1970s ==
1979

- S.P.S. Andrew (DSc)
- Sir Robert Bradlaw (DSc)
- Baron Diamond of Gloucester (LLD)
- Professor M.E. Howard (DLitt)
- Dennis Irvine (DSc)
- Queenie Dorothy Leavis (DLitt)
- Lord Hunt of Llanvair Waterdine (DLitt)
- Baroness Seear (LLD)
- E.J. Read (MA)
- Sydney Percy Smith (DSc)
- William Taylor (DLitt)
- Professor Sir John Walton (DSc)

1978

- Reinhard Bendix (DLitt)
- Richard Wood, Baron Holderness (LLD)
- Sir John Charnley (DSc)
- Kristján Eldjárn, President of Iceland (DLitt)
- Professor Philip Grierson (DLitt)
- Dr Theodore Morris Sugden (DSc)
- Clement Charles Tapp (MA)
- Lord Arnold Weinstock (DLitt)
- Richard F Wood (DLitt)

1977

- Sir Kenneth Lyon Blaxter (DSc)
- Professor Sheppard Sunderland Frere (DLitt)
- Arthur Koestler (DLitt)
- Professor William Norton Medlicott (DLitt)
- Sir Claus Moser (PhD)
- Innocentina Tomasini Pearmain (MA)
- Lord Alexander of Potterhill (DLitt)
- John Collins Siddons (MSc)
- Edmund Williamson (LLD)

1976

- Claude Thomas Bissell (DLitt)
- Aaron Copland (DMus)
- Norma Franklin (DSc)
- Margaret Gowing (DLitt)
- Helena Hayward (MA)
- Prince Edward, Duke of Kent (LLD)
- Charles Rosen (DMus)
- Sir Rodney Smith (DSc)
- Lord Widgery (LLD)

1975

- Rupert Cross (LLD)
- Kenneth Fourness (MSc)
- Donald Hunt (DMus)
- Harold Macmillan (DLitt)
- Rosemary Murray (DSc)
- Charles Pannell (LLD)
- David Woodbine Parish (LLD)
- Stephen Roskill (DLitt)
- Arnold Smith (LLD)
- Professor Sir John Stallworthy (DSc)
- Humphrey Trevelyan (DLitt)
- Emeritus Professor Ronald Tunbridge (Dsc)
- Ralph C Yablon (LLD)

1974

- Pierre Boulez (DMus)
- Asa Briggs (DLitt)
- Richard Crossman (DLitt)
- Arthur Dower (LLD)
- Sir Reginald Goodall (DMus)
- David Hockney (MA)
- Sir Brynmor Jones (LLD)
- Alexander MacLennan (MEd)
- Frederick Sidney Snow (LLD)
- Andre Varga (LLD)

1973

- Kenneth John Bonser (MA)
- Sir John Francis Boyd (LLD)
- Arnold Stanley Vincent Burgen (DSc)
- George Sidney Roberts Kitson Clark (DLitt)
- Professor Sir Frederick Sidney Dainton (DSc)
- Jean Esther Floud (DLitt)
- Arthur Gilpin (MSc)
- Professor Sydney Goldstein (DSc)
- Harold Gray (LLD)
- Bernard Lyons (LLD)
- George Frederick Sedgwick (MA)
- Wole Soyinka (DLitt)
- Professor Julius Stone (LLD)

1972

- Baroness Bacon (Alice Martha) (LLD)
- Lady Barbirolli (Evelyn Rothwell) (MA)
- Nadia Boulanger (DMus)
- Sir Colin Douglas Buchanan (DSc)
- Sir Alec Clegg (LLD)
- Professor V.L. Ginzburg (DLitt)
- Vaughan Loach (LLD)
- Arthur Stanley Maney (MA)
- Victor Sawdon Pritchett (DLitt)
- Arthur Raistrick (DLitt)
- Baron Butler of Saffron Walden (DLitt)
- Professor Helmut Zahn (DSc)

1971

- Hugh Foot, Baron Caradon(LLD)
- Sir Ronald Gould (DLitt)
- Roy Jenkins (LLD)
- Sir Donald MacDougall (DLitt)
- Professor Sir George Porter (DSc)
- Georg Solti (DMus)
- Sir Roger Stevens (LLD)
- Dorothy Whitelock (DLitt)
- Professor Rudolf Wittkower (DLitt)

1970

- Geoffrey Crowther, Baron Crowther (DLitt)
- Clifford Curzon (DMus)
- Alexander Graeme Dickson (LLD)
- Kenneth Hargreaves (LLD)
- Sir Howard Lesley Kirkley (MA)
- Robert Lowell (DLitt)
- William Pitts (MA)
- Professor Tadeus Reichstein (DSc)
- Professor Bazaryn Shirendyb (DLitt)
- Professor Henri Talon (DLitt)
- Dame Janet Maria Vaughan (DSc)

== 1960s ==
1969

- Professor Philip Rowland Allison (DSc)
- Professor Damaso Alonso (DLitt)
- Frank Beckwith (MPhil)
- Sir Maurice (Richard) Bridgeman (LLD)
- Sir Derman (Guy) Christopherson (LLD)
- James Richard Gregson (MA)
- Donald Hopewell (LLD)
- Professor Sir Fred Hoyle (DSc)
- Sir Bernard Kenyon (LLD) Walter Pagel (LLD)
- Dowager Marchioness of Reading (LLD)
- Elizabeth Grace Watts (LLD)

1968

- Douglas Crockatt (LLD)
- Marie Hartley (MA)
- Harold Himsworth (DSc)
- Archer John Porter Martin (DSc)
- Davidson Sylvester Hector Willoughby Nicol (LLD)
- Nikolaus Pevsner (DLitt)
- Pierre-Paul Schweitzer (LLD)
- Eric Treacy (LLD)
- Lady Dorothy Tunbridge (MA)
- Sir Ernest George Woodroofe (LLD)

1967

- David William Currie (DSc)
- Sir Frank Francis (DLitt)
- King Gustaf VI Adolf of Sweden (LLD)
- Lord Jackson of Burnley (LLD)
- Sir Henry Jones (LLD)
- David Henry Lewis (MSc)
- Dame Kathleen Lonsdale (LLD)
- John Primatt Redcliffe Maud (LLD)
- Robert Mayer (LLD)
- Irene McAdam (MA)
- Mary Moorman (DLitt)
- Rasipuram Krishnaswamy Narayan (LLD)
- Jean-Paul Sartre (DLitt)
- Salimuzzaman Siddiqui (DSc)
- Julius Adams Stratton (LLD)
- U Thant (LLD)
- Emeritus Professor Henry Cherry Versey (LLD)
- Joshua Samuel Alderman Walsh (LLD)
- Sir William Worsley (LLD)
- Sir Norman Wright (LLD)

1966

- Air Vice-Marshal Geoffrey Hill Ambler (LLD)
- David Curie (MSc)
- Baroness Gaitskell of Egremont (LLD)
- Sir Frank Kearton (LLD)
- HRH Duchess of Kent (LLD)
- Emeritus Professor Alfred Charles Bernard Lovell (DSc)
- Sir Alexander Oppenheim (LLD)
- Lord Stewart of Fulham (LLD)
- Mr Justice Geoffrey De Paiva Veale (LLD)
- Dame Fanny Waterman (MA)

1965

- Professor Saul Alder (DSc)
- Lord Edward Boyle (LLD)
- Lord Brock (LLD)
- Professor Sir Ernst Hans Josef Gombrich (DLitt)
- Sir Charles Illingworth (LLD)
- Frank Leavis (DLitt)
- Shrimati Hansa Mehta (LLD)
- Ronald George Wreyford Norrish (DSc)
- Professor Johannes Franciscus Nuboer (LLD)
- Frederick Oppenheim (LLD)
- Henry Platt (LLD)
- Emeritus Professor Leslie Norman Pyrah (DSc)
- Sir Michael Kent Tippett (DMus)
- Canon Rowland John Wood (MA)

1964

- Elsa M. Carroll (MA)
- Harry Dawson (MA)
- Margaretha Albertina Maria Klompe (LLD)
- Sir Hans Krebs (DSc)
- Sir Simon Marks (LLD)
- Sir Harry Melville (DSc)
- Rt. Rev. John Moorman (DLitt)
- Baron Morris of Grasmere (LLD)
- W.T. Oliver (MA)
- A.D. Waley (DLitt)
- Leslie G Wilson (LLD)

1963

- Professor Alfred Gustave Herbert Bachrach (DLitt)
- Ralph Chislett (MSc)
- Charles Henry Crabtree (LLD)
- Frank Dawtry (MA)
- Lord Denning (LLD)
- Kenneth Onwuka Dike (LLD)
- Frederick George Baxendale Hutchings (MA)
- Col. Geoffrey Kitson (LLD)
- Lord Lever (LLD)
- Lady Mary Helen Oglivie (LLD)

1962

- Professor William Beare (LLD)
- Eirikur Benedikz (MA)
- Lord Patrick Maynard Stuart Blackett (DSc)
- Professor Edmund Charles Blunden (DLitt)
- Sir Christopher Cox (LLD)
- Charles William Duncombe (LLD)
- Sir Harry Hylton-Foster (LLD)
- Louis Harold Gray (DSc)
- Alexander Hollaender (DSc)
- Professor Alexander Mikhajlovich Kuzin (DSc)
- Raymond Laterjet (DSc)
- Professor Konrad Zacharias Lorenz (DSc)
- Alva Myrdal (DLitt)
- Professor Willem Jacob Verdenius (LLD)
- Very Rev. Eric Milner-White (DLitt)

1961

- Arthur Richard Baines (LLD)
- Professor Adolph Butenandt (DSc)
- Professor Richard Lester Cahn (DSc)
- James Percy Cocker (M.Ch.D)
- Sir Henry Hallett Dale (DSc)
- Sir Ronald Aylmer Fisher (DSc)
- Sir John Hammond (DSc)
- Barbara Hepworth (DLitt)
- William Jones (LLD)
- Professor Charles MacAfee (DSc)
- Sir Robert Menzies (LLD)
- Sir Jeremy Raisman (LLD)
- Sir James Wilson Robertson (LLD)
- Rev. Norman Snaith (DLitt)
- Martha Steinitz (MA)
- Professor Jens Waerhaug (DSc)

1960

- Ivy Compton-Burnett (DLitt)
- Barker Thomas Clegg (LLD)
- Philip Gooding (MSc)
- Sir Edwin Herbert (LLD)
- William Colley Monckton Matterson (MSc)
- Sir John Neale (DLitt)
- Sir George Sansom (DLitt)

== 1950s ==
1959

- Professor Alfred Ewert (DLitt)
- Sir Edward Hale (LLD)
- Earl of Harewood (LLD)
- Sir George Raymond Hinchcliffe (LLD)
- Dorothy Crowfoot Hodgkin (DSc)
- Sir Rudolph Peters (DSc)
- Jonas Edward Salk (DSc)
- Sir Phillip Manderson Sherlock (LLD)
- Sir Harold Smith (LLD)
- Norma Sykes (DLitt)

1958

- Professor Oene Bottema (LLD)
- Mary Lucy Cartwright (DSc)
- Frederick Donald Coggan (DD)
- Professor Sir John G Edwards (DLitt)
- Professor Peter Racine Fricker (DMus)
- William Harrison (LLD)
- George Kirk (MA)
- Professor Walter Von Wartburg (DLitt)

1957

- Lord Janner (LLD) Sir Ivor Jennings (LLD)
- Margaret Mead (DSc)
- Professor Gunnar Myrdal (LLD)
- Lord Ramsey of Canterbury (DD)
- Mary Stocks (LLD)
- E.W. Taylor (DSc)
- Lord Weeks (LLD)

1956

- Alderman/Cuthbert Lowell Ackroyd (LLD)
- Sir John Douglas Cockcroft (DSc)
- James Bryant Conant (LLD)
- Sir George Dyson (LLD)
- James Digby Firth (MA)
- Walter Freudenberg (DSc)
- Vijaya Lakshmi Pandit (LLD)
- Rev. Arthur Reeve (DD)
- Professor Sir Ian Richmond (DLitt)
- Edward Rickerby (MA)
- Sir Oliver Graham Sutton (DSc)

1955

- Sir William Linton Andrews (DSc)
- Major Philip Maurice Beachcroft (LLD)
- Sydney Clayton Fryers (MA)
- Lord Middleton (LLD)
- Emeritus Professor William Milne (LLD)
- Edwin Muir (DLitt)
- John Henry Nicholson (LLD)
- Dorothy Phillips (LLD)
- Joseph Slepian (DSc)
- Professor Bruno Snell (DLitt)

1954

- Duchess of Devonshire (widow of 10th Duke) (LLD)
- Queen Elizabeth the Queen Mother (LLD)
- Professor Evarts Ambrose Graham (LLD)
- John Hindley (LLD)
- Sir David Owen (LLD)
- Professor Wilder Graves Penfield (LLD)
- Fred Rankin (LLD)
- Sir Harry Shackleton (LLD)
- Sir Arthur Trueman (LLD)
- Sir Cecil Wakeley (LLD)

1953

- Professor John Baker (DSc)
- Goodwin Batterson Beach (DLitt)
- Professor Petrus Johannes Enk (DLitt)
- Margot Fonteyn (DLitt)
- Eugene Freyssinet (DSc)
- Thomas Girtin (LLD)
- Eric Craven Gregory (LLD)
- Professor Charles Huggins (DSc)
- Professor Christopher Kelk Ingold (DSc)
- Cyril Meggitt (MA)
- Lord Milner of Leeds (LLD)
- Alfred Prior (MA)
- William Hunter Rose (MSc)
- Viscount Herbert Louis Samuel (DLitt)
- Percy Scholes (DLitt)
- Ronald Ogier Ward (DSc)
- John Wilkinson (MSc)

1952

- Albert Herman Aldridge (LLD)
- Professor Marius Adolphus Van Bouwdijk Bastiaanse (LLD)
- Ernest Green (LLD)
- Sir Cyril Hinshelwood (DSc)
- Sir Eardley Holland (LLD)
- Wyndham Lewis (DLitt)
- Arthur Ransome (DLitt)
- William Riley-Smith (LLD)
- Sir James Turner (LLD)

1951

- Alderman David Beevers (LLD)
- Viscountess Margaret Boyne (LLD)
- Kathleen Chambers (LLD)
- Rev. George Armitage Chase (DD)
- Lady Helen Cynthia Colville (LLD)
- Dame Julia Myra Hess (LLD)
- Sir Hubert Houldsworth (LLD)
- Sir John Huggins (LLD)
- John James Ilett (MA)
- Gertrude Illingworth (MA)
- James Laybourn (MA)
- Dame Hilda Nora Lloyd (LLD)
- Thomas Lodge (DLitt)
- Lawrence Lumley (LLD)
- Sir George Martin (LLD)
- John Morrell (LLD)
- Angela Pery (LLD)
- Brigadier James Noel Tetley (LLD)

1950

- Sir Robert Birley (LLD)
- Lord (David) Cecil (DLitt)
- Lord (Francis Raymond) Evershed (LLD)
- Professor Barker Fairley (DLitt)
- Emeritus Professor Robert Whytlaw-Gray (DSc)
- Alexander Lindsay (LLD)
- Louis Harold Mountbatten (LLD)
- William Pickles (DSc)
- Major Walter Pothecary (LLD)

== 1940s ==
1949

- Phyllis Eleanor Bentley (DLitt)
- Professor James Couper Brash (DSc)
- Sir James Chadwick (DSc)
- General Dwight David Eisenhower (LLD)
- Arnold Trevor Green (DSc)
- Bernard Jones (LLD)
- Dame Lillian Penson (LLD)
- Emile Victor Rieu (DLitt)

1948

- Lewis William Douglas (LLD)
- Sir Percival Hartley (DSc)
- Rev. William Hughes (DD)
- Lord MacKintosh of Halifax (LLD)
- Dame Edith Sitwell (DLitt)
- Sir Bracewell Smith (LLD)
- Terry Thomas (LLD)

1947

- Charles Frederick Ratcliffe Brotherton (LLD)
- Professor Henry Buckley Charlton (DLitt)
- Andrew Browne Cunningham (LLD)
- Lt. General Sir William George Dobbie (LLD)
- Wilfred Joseph Halliday (PhD)
- Thomas Edmund Harvey (LLD)
- Lt. Col. Sir John Alexander Dunnington-Jefferson (LLD)
- Henry Mahony (PhD)
- Professor Sigurður Nordal (DLitt)
- Michael Polanyi (DSc)
- William Goodwin Senior (PhD)
- Croydon Whittaker (DSc)

1946

- Herbert Vere Evatt (LLD)
- The Viscount Leathers (LLD)
- Sir Frederick Pile (LLD)
- Lord (William) Slim (LLD)
- Arthur Tedder (LLD)
- Lord Waverley (LLD)

1945

- Sir Robert Anthony Eden (LLD)
- Elinor G. Lupton (LLD)
- Henry Moore (DLitt)
- James Francis Tait
- George Thompson (MA)
- Sir Henry Tizard (DSc)
- Gerard Veale (LLD)

1944

- Gordon Bottomley (DLitt)
- Sir Montague Burton (LLD)
- Jessie Kitson (LLD)
- Harold Whitaker (PhD)
- Sir Percy Winfield (LLD)

1943

- Col. Hugh Delabere Bousfield (LLD)
- Sir Charles Travis Clay (DLitt)
- Edward Victor Evans (DSc)
- Rev. Cyril Forester Garbett (DD)
- Margaret Storm Jameson (DLitt)
- Henry Raper (LLD)

1942

- John Winant (LLD)

1941

- Emeritus Professor Paul Barbier (DLitt)
- Emeritus Professor John William Cobb (DSc)
- Emeritus Professor Alexander Thompson (LLD)

== 1930s ==
1939

- Stanley Baldwin (LLD)
- Sir William Lawrence Bragg (DSc)
- Edward William Cavendish (LLD)
- John Whelan Dulanty (LLD)
- Sir Arthur Stanley Eddington (DSc)
- Thomas Stearns Eliot (DLitt)
- Dowager Countess of Halifax (LLD)
- Sir William Holdsworth (DLitt)
- John Edward Humphery (LLD)
- John Kirk (PhD)
- Sir John Charles Ledingham (DSc)
- Rev. Charles Lunt (DD)
- Sir Charles McGrath (LLD)
- William Morrison (LLD)
- Frank Parkinson (LLD)
- Leonard Rowden (DSc)
- Sir Frank Stenton (DLitt)
- Sir John Stopford (DSc)
- Rev. Vincent Taylor (DD)

1938

- Rupert Beckett (LLD)
- William Sawney Bisat (MSc)
- Arthur Neville Chamberlain (LLD)
- Cecil John Turrell Cronshaw (DSc)
- Professor Alfred Fowler (DSc)
- Professor Edmund Johnston Garwood (DSc)
- Giovanni Gentile (DLitt)
- Walter Parsons (PhD)

1937

- Lord George Ranken Askwith (LLD)
- Viscount Stanley Melbourne Bruce of Melbourne (LLD)
- Professor George Stuart Gordon (DLitt)
- Professor John Jamieson (LLD)
- Joseph Jones (LLD)
- Rev. Frederick Wiseman (DLitt)

1936

- Sir Edward Bairstow (DMus)
- John Jeremy Brigg (LLD)
- Raymond Wilson Chambers (DLitt)
- Sir Henry Herbert Craster (DLitt)
- Henry Drysdale Dakin (LLD)
- Richard James Gordon (MA)
- Professor Arthur Berriedale Keith (LLD)
- Professor Frederic Stanley Kipping (DSc)
- Henry Lanchester (DLitt)
- Langford Price (LLD)
- Sir Josiah Stamp (LLD)
- Norman Walker (MSc)

1935

- Professor Harvey Cushing (DSc)
- Walter Elliot (LLD)
- Rev. Canon George Garrod (PhD)
- The Earl of Harewood (Henry Lascelles) (LLD)
- Ernest Rutherford (DSc)
- Emeritus Professor William Stroud (DSc)

1934

- Sir Robert Wilfred De Yarburgh Bateson (LLD)
- Emeritus Professor Joseph Shaw Bolton (DSc)
- Professor John Harold Clapham (DLitt)
- Beryl Katherine Gott (LLD)
- Sir Henry Stuart- Jones (DLitt)
- Arthur Mann (LLD)
- Sir Robert Muir (DSc)
- Elizabeth Mary Wright (DLitt)

1933

- Francis Askew (LLD)
- Frederick Delius (DLitt)
- Frank Elgee (PhD)
- Emeritus Professor Arthur James Grant (DLitt)
- Sir Charles Peers (DLitt)
- Sir John Simon (LLD)
- Col. Charles Harold Tetley (LLD)
- Sir Joseph Thomson (DSc)
- Elizabeth Winfield (MA)
- Henry Worth (MSc)

1932

- Sir James Hinchcliffe (LLD)
- Osbert John Howarth (PhD)
- Dame Ellen Musson (LLD)
- Professor Sir Herbert Read (DLitt)

1931

- Emeritus Professor Alfred George Barrs (LLD)
- Bertrand Dawson (LLD)
- Sir Walter Morley Fletcher (DSc)
- Arthur Hawkyard (LLD)
- Sir Frederick Hopkins (DSc)
- Sir George Newman (LLD)
- Sir John Bland-Sutton (LLD)
- Jane Harriett Walker (LLD)

1930

- Henry Crowther (MSc)
- Arthur Greenwood (LLD)
- Sir William Hadow (DLitt)
- Walter Hargreaves (LLD)
- Sir Owen Richardson (DSc)
- Rev. William Temple (LLD)
- Sir Henry Walker (LLD)

== 1920s ==
1929

- William Edwards (DLitt)
- Sir Algernon Freeman Firth (LLD)
- Rt. Rev. Walter Howard Frere (DLitt)
- Emeritus Professor Thomas Griffith (DSc)
- Lucy Lowe (DLitt)
- Charles Mayo (DSc)

1928

- Sir Albert Ernest Bain (LLD)
- Alexander Campbell (LLD)
- Edwin Kitson Clark (LLD)
- Evelyn Cavendish, Duchess of Devonshire (LLD)
- Morton Latham (LLD)
- Walter Marston (MSc)
- Charles Onions (DLitt)
- Charles Rippon (PhD)
- William Thorburn (MSc)
- Henry Whitley (LLD)

1927

- Katharine Stewart-Murray, Duchess of Atholl (LLD)
- Fred Barraclough (MA)
- Frederick Orpen Bower (DSc)
- Thomas Robinson Ferens (LLD)
- James Graham (PhD)
- John Scott Haldane (DSc)
- Sir Arthur Keith (LLD)
- Robert Millikan (DSc)
- Sir Charles Parsons (LLD)
- Emeritus Professor Arthur Perkin (DSc)
- Sir James Roberts (LLD)
- Professor Nevil Sidgwick (DSc)
- Philip Snowden (LLD)

1926

- Emeritus Professor Percy Kendall (DSc)
- Sir David Milne-Watson (LLD)

1925

- Dame Sidney Jane Browne (Diploma in Nursing)
- Princess Mary, Viscountess Lascelles(LLD)
- Mary Rundle, (Diploma in Nursing)
- Sir Arthur Stanley (LLD)

1924

- Edmund George Arnold (LLD)
- Arthur Balfour (LLD)
- George Robinson Brench (MA)
- Col. Stephenson Robert Clarke (LLD)
- Emeritus Professor Julius Behrend Cohen (DSc)
- Emeritus Professor John Edwin Eddison (DSc)
- William Foot Husband (LLD)
- Sir Percy Jackson (LLD)
- Joseph Lowden (LLD)
- Professor Sir Berkeley Moynihan (LLD)
- Hannah Robertson (DLitt)
- Sir Michael Sadler (DLitt)
- Herbert Thompson (DLitt)

1923

- Sir Edward Allen Brotherton (LLD)
- Major John William Dent (LLD)
- Lawrence Dundas, Marquess of Zetland (DLitt)
- Frank Kidson (MA)
- William Mayo (DSc)
- Frederick Peaker (MA)
- Professor Arthur Smithells (DSc)
- Edwin Talbot (LLD)
- James Williams (LLD)
- Sir Charles Henry Wilson (LLD)
- Sir William Henry Worsley (LLD)

1922

- David Beatty (LLD)
- Henry Illingworth Bowring (LLD)
- Benjamin Broadbent (LLD)
- Maurice de Broglie, Duc de Broglie (DSc)
- Sir Dugald Clerk (DSc)
- Edith Bessie Cook (MA)
- Sir Frank Watson Dyson (DSc)
- David Lloyd George (LLD)
- Sir Richard Arman Gregory (DSc)
- Richard William Haydon (MSc)
- Rev. Bernard Horner (MA)
- Henry McLaren (LLD)
- Sir Arthur Peake (LLD)
- Carl Peterson (DSc)
- Sir Bruce Richmond (DLitt)
- Sir Charles Sherrington (DSc)
- Sir Harold Stiles (DSc)
- Rt. Rev. Thomas Strong (DLitt)
- Charles Francis Tetley (LLD)
- Professor Pierre Weiss (DSc)
- Archibald Wheeler (MA)

1920

- William Henry Barber (LLD)
- John Bickersteth (LLD)
- Rev. Canon John Neale Dalton (LLD)
- Peter Macintyre Evans (LLD)
- Sir Douglas Haig (LLD)

== 1910s ==
1919

- John Gilbert Baker (DSc)
- Sir William Henry Bragg (DSc)
- John Rawlinson Ford (LLD)
- Francis Vaughan Hall (MA)
- Sir Charles Holmes (DLitt)
- Sir Henry Jackson (DSc)
- Sir Alfred Keogh (DSc)
- Charles Lupton (LLD)
- John Mews (LLD)
- General Sir Herbert Charles Plumer (LLD)
- Sir Almroth Wright (DSc)

1917

Herbert Austin Fricker

- Herbert Austin Fricker (MA)

1915

- David Forsyth (LLD)
- Rev. Charles Hargrove (DLitt)
- Thomas Nelson (MSc)
- William Roebuck (MSc)
- Thomas Sheppard (MSc)
- John William Taylor (MSc)
- Harold Wager (DSc)
- Rev. Philip Wicksteed (DLitt)
- John Grimshaw Wilkinson (MSc)
- Thomas Woodhead (MSc)

1914

- Thomas Scales Carter (MSc)
- Emeritus Professor Henry Procter (DSc)
- Emeritus Professor Charles Vaughan (DLitt)
- Emile Verhaeren (DLitt)

1912

- Charles Carpenter (DSc)
- Arthur Cooper (LLD)
- Anna Paulina Eddison (LLD)
- Sir William Edward Garforth (LLD)
- Adolph Greiner (DSc)
- Sir Robert Hadfield (DSc)
- Rev. William Keeling (LLD)
- Thomas Newbigging (DSc)
- Sir Swire Smith (LLD)
- Kommerzienrat Friedrich Springorum (DSc)
- John Stead (DSc)
- Sir Corbert Woodall (DSc)

1910

- H. H. Asquith (LLD)
- Sir Hugh Bell (LLD)
- Victor Cavendish, 9th Duke of Devonshire (LLD)
- Henry Petty-Fitzmaurice, 5th Marquess of Lansdowne (LLD)
- Francis John Haverfield (DLitt)
- Sir Alfred Hopkinson (LLD)
- James Lowther (LLD)
- Arthur Lupton (LLD)
- Sir Clements Markham (DSc)
- Robert Offley Ashburton Crewe-Milnes (LLD)
- William Nicholson (LLD)
- Sir William Osler (DSc)
- Arthur Sidgwick (DLitt)
- John Strutt (Lord Rayleigh) (DSc)

== 1900s ==
1909

- Sir James Crichton-Browne (DSc)
- Thomas Walter Harding (LLD)
- Baron Lang of Lambeth (Cosmo Gordon Lang) (LLD)
- Ronald Ross (DSc)

1907

- Robert Collyer (DLitt)

1906

- Sir Thomas Clifford Allbutt (DSc)
- Heinrich Caro (DSc)
- William Boyd Carpenter (DLitt)
- Alfred Grandidier (DSc)
- Albin Haller (DSc)
- Sir Charles Holroyd (DLitt)
- Sir Edwin Lankester (DSc)
- Beilby Lawley (LLD)
- Carl Liebermann (DSc)
- Carl Von Martius (DSc)
- Paul Pelseneer (DSc)
- Sir William Perkin (DSc)
- Sir Owen Roberts (LLD)
- Heinrich Rubens (DSc)
- Thomas Percy Sykes (MA)
- Herbert Hall Turner (DSc)

1904

- Sir Arthur Herbert Dyke Acland (LLD)
- Tempest Anderson (DSc)
- Alfred Austin (DLitt)
- Sir John Barran (LLD)
- Sir Isaac Lowthian Bell (DSc)
- Sir William Bousfield (LLD)
- Sir William Henry Broadbent (DSc)
- Lady Frederick Cavendish (LLD)
- Spencer Cavendish, 8th Duke of Devonshire (LLD)
- Richard Assheton Cross (LLD)
- William Dalrymple Maclagan (Archbishop of York) (LLD)
- Sir Henry Walford Davies (LLD)
- Sir Edward Elgar (LLD)
- Rev. Andrew Martin Fairbairn (DLitt)
- Charles George Milnes Gaskell (LLD)
- Sir Jonathan Hutchinson (DSc)
- John Hughlings Jackson (DSc)
- William Jackson (LLD)
- Sir James Kitson (DSc)
- Henry Lascelles, 5th Earl of Harewood (LLD)
- Marmaduke Francis Constable-Maxwell (LLD)
- Professor Louis Miall (DSc)
- Sir Charles Hubert Parry (LLD)
- Lawrence Parsons (DSc)
- Sir Francis Powell (LLD)
- Sir Arthur Mayo-Robson (DSc)
- Sir Arthur Rollit (DLitt)
- Sir Arthur Rucker (DSc)
- Sir Charles Villiers Stanford (LLD)
- Thomas Teale (DSc)
- William Thomson (DSc)
- Sir Edward Thorpe (DSc)
- Claudius Wheelhouse (DSc)
- Charles Wood (LLD)
- Joseph Wright (DLitt)

== Sources ==
- "Honorary graduates 1904 to present". University of Leeds.
