= Thorganby Hall =

House in Thorganby, North Yorkshire, England

Coordinates: 53°51′58″N 0°57′08″W

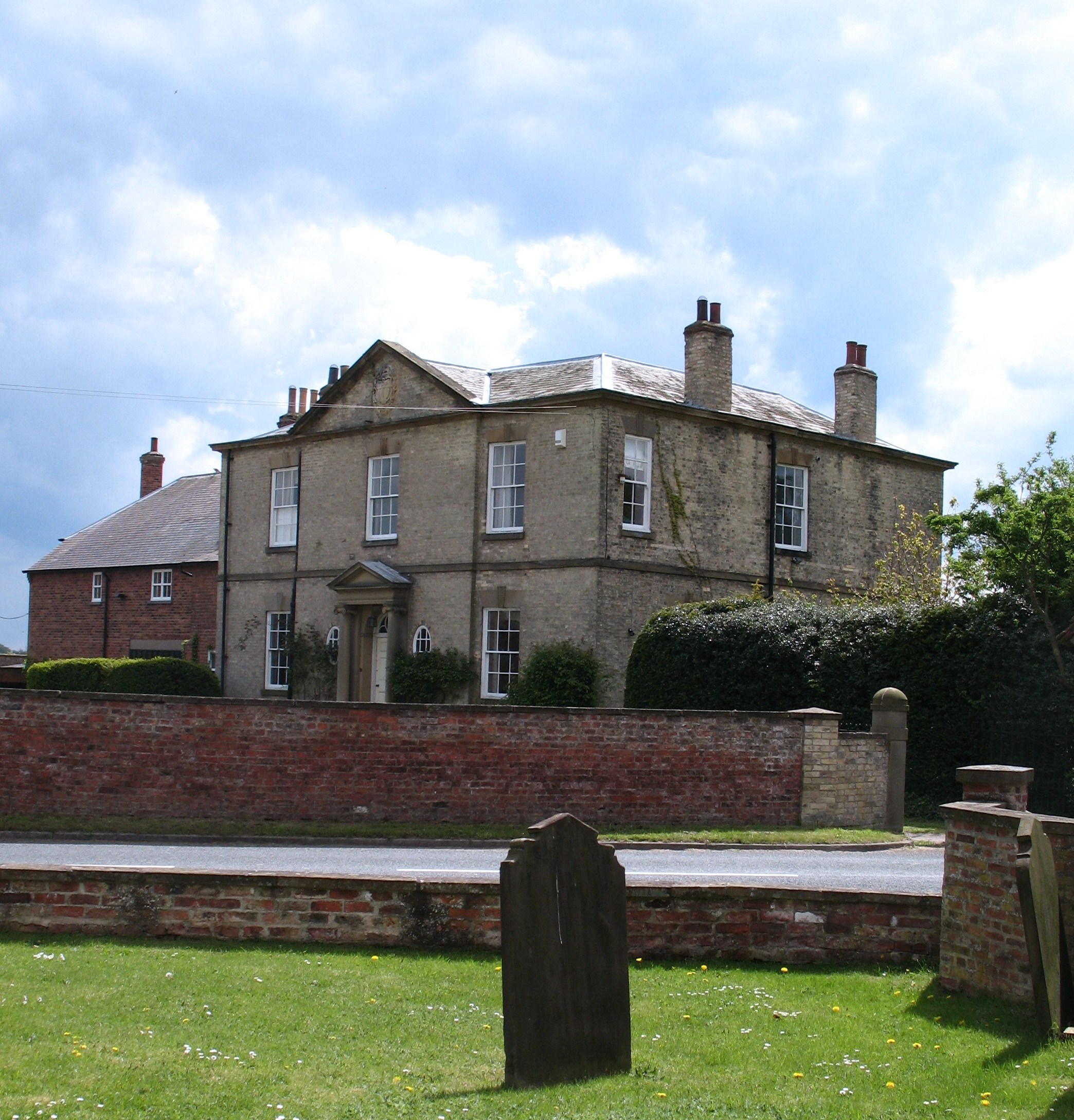
The building, in 2010

Thorganby Hall is a historic building in Thorganby, North Yorkshire, a village in England.

The house was first recorded in 1772, but probably had a long history as the manor house, owned by the Annesley family. The current building was completed in 1822, at which time it was owned by the Dunnington family. In the 1840s, Thicket Priory became the manor house, and Thorganby was generally let out to tenants, or used by the steward of the estate. In the mid or late 20th century, it was extended to the left. The building was grade II listed in 1966.

The house is built of gault brick, with red brick at the rear, a plinth, stone dressings, a floor band, a cornice, and a hipped Welsh slate roof. It has two storeys and three bays, the middle bay projecting slightly under a pediment containing a coat of arms. In the centre is a distyle Ionic portico with a dentilled frieze and a pediment, and a doorway with an ornamental fanlight. This flanked by oval windows, and the other windows are sashes with wedge lintels and fluted keystones. Inside, the hall has a panelled ceiling, and most of the rooms have original cornices. There are early window shutters, an open well staircase, and coved arches in the rear rooms.

The coach house, hayloft and dovecote were probably built at the same time as the house, although the Victoria County History suggest that they may predate it. They are grade II listed and were altered in the late 20th century. The coach house is built of pinkish-brown brick, with red brick dressings and a Welsh slate roof. It consists of a three-storey central bay flanked by two-storey wings. In the centre is a round-arched carriage entrance in red gauged brick, and above is a round-arched window and two rows of dove openings with landing shelves. The roof is hipped, and has a square cupola with dove holes and a weathervane. The roofs of the wings have stone coping and kneelers, and contain doorways with oculi above.

The stable range is similarly grade II listed, and is either contemporary with the house or predates it. It has been converted for other purposes. It is built of pinkish-brown brick, with red brick dressings, and a grey slate roof with stone coping and kneelers. There are two storeys and twelve bays. On the ground floor is a doorway with a fanlight, blocked doorways and casement windows, all under flat arches of red rubbed brick. On the upper floor are twelve oculi with red brick surrounds, two infilled with brick.

== See also ==
- Listed buildings in Thorganby, North Yorkshire
