= John Dunnington-Jefferson =

Lieutenant-Colonel Sir John Alexander Dunnington-Jefferson, 1st Baronet, DSO, DL, JP (10 April 1884 – 12 April 1979) was an English soldier, landowner and local politician.

== Biography ==
John Alexander Dunnington-Jefferson was born in Bournemouth on 10 April 1884, the eldest son of Captain Mervyn Dunnington-Jefferson (1850–1912), JP, of Thicket Priory and Middlethorpe Hall, Yorkshire, and his wife Louisa Dorothy (died 1951), daughter of the Rev. John Barry. The Dunnington family had been landowners in the East Riding from the 17th century and had an estate centred on Thorganby and West Cottingwith. John Dunnington-Jefferson inherited the family estates from his childless uncle in 1928; in 1955, he sold Thicket Priory to Carmelite nuns and moved to Thorganby Hall but then sold his lands in Thorganby and West Cottingwith in 1964.

After schooling at Eton College, Dunnington-Jefferson attended the Royal Military College, Sandhurst, and then joined the Royal Fusiliers in 1904. He served in Europe during the First World War, earning the Distinguished Service Order (DSO) in 1917 and being mentioned in dispatches six times; he also received the French Legion of Honour, the Belgian War Cross and the Italian Order of St Maurice and St Lazarus. He ended the war a Brevet Major and retired in 1919 as a Lieutenant-Colonel.

With the war over, Dunnington-Jefferson pursued a career in local politics. He was elected onto the East Riding of Yorkshire's County Council in 1922 and served on it until the council was abolished as a result of the local government reforms of 1974. He became its chairman in 1936, a position he retained for 32 years, until 1968.

In the meantime he had been a Justice of the Peace since 1921 and Deputy Lieutenant since 1936. He was appointed a Knight Bachelor in 1944 and created a Baronet in 1958, "for public services in Yorkshire". He also received an honorary doctor of laws (LLD) degree from the University of Leeds and an honorary doctor of the university (DUniv) degree from the University of York.

He married, in 1938, Isobel, daughter of Colonel H. A. Cape, DSO; together they had one daughter and one son: Rosemary Nicolette (born 1941) and Mervyn Stewart (1943–2014), who succeeded his father in the baronetcy.

Sir John died in York on 12 April 1979, aged 95. He deposited his family's papers at Hull University Archives in 1974 (reference GB 50 U DDJ).

== Likenesses ==
- Sir John Alexander Dunnington-Jefferson, 1st Bt, by Walter Stoneman (bromide print, 5^{1}/2 in. x 3 ^{3}/4 in. (141 mm x 95 mm)), commissioned 1948; National Portrait Gallery, London (Photographs Collection, NPG x167318),

Other offices
Preceded by The Lord Deramore	Chairman, East Riding County Council; 1936–1968	Succeeded by The Lord Halifax
Baronetage of the United Kingdom
New creation	Baronet (of Thorganby Hall, Yorkshire); 1958–1979	Succeeded by Mervyn Dunnington-Jefferson
