= Elaine Oran =

American aerospace engineer, computer scientist, physicist

Elaine Surick Oran
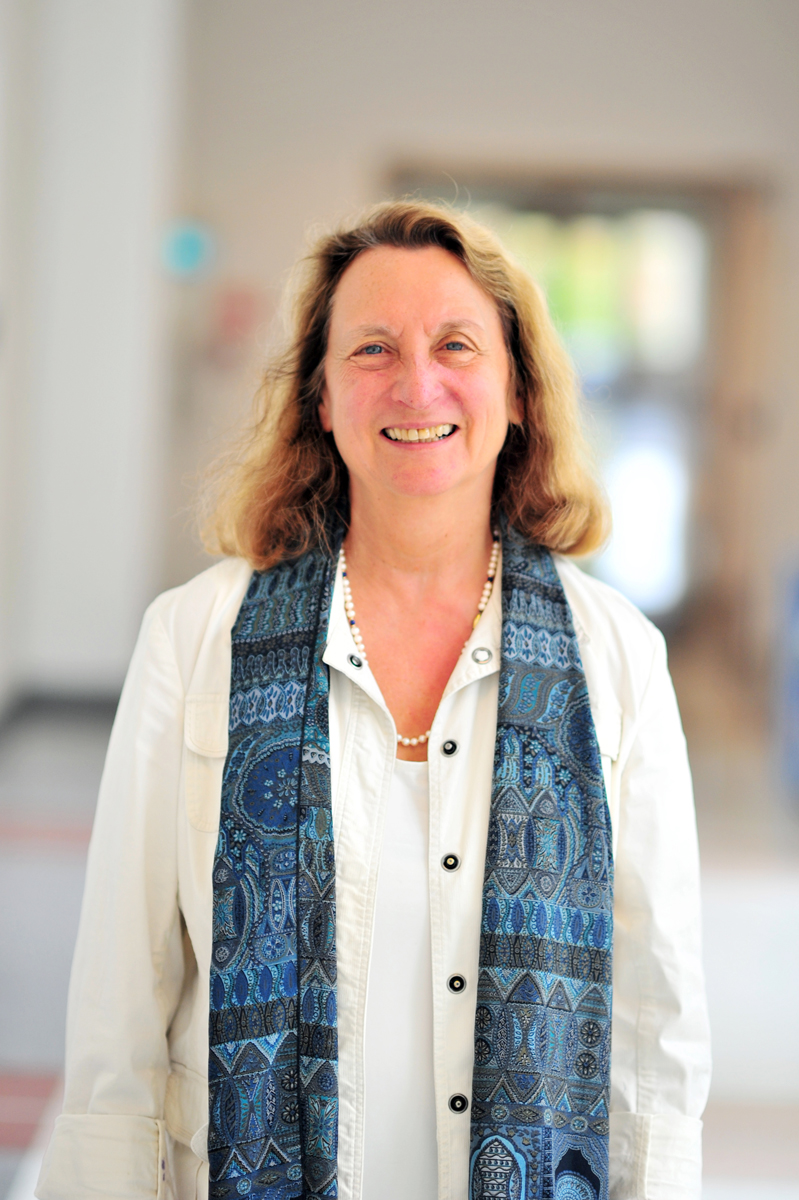
- Oran in 2013
- Born: April 16, 1946 (age 80); Rome, Georgia, U.S.
- Education: Bryn Mawr College; Yale University
- Spouse: Daniel Oran
- Awards: Fluid Dynamics Prize (APS), 2013
- Scientific career
- Fields: Computational physics, Explosions, Propulsion, Turbulence, Astrophysics
- Workplaces: Texas A&M University; University of Maryland, College Park; U.S. Naval Research Laboratory

External videos
- Dr. Elaine S. Oran: WITI Hall of Fame 2002 Induction Video, Women In Technology International

Elaine Surick Oran (born April 16, 1946) is an American physical scientist and is considered a world authority on numerical methods for large-scale simulation of physical systems. She has pioneered computational technology to solve complex reactive flow problems, unifying concepts from science, mathematics, engineering, and computer science in a new methodology. An incredibly diverse range of phenomena can be modeled and better understood using her techniques for numerical simulation of fluid flows, ranging from the tightly grouped movements of fish in Earth's oceans to the explosions of far-flung supernovae in space. Her work has contributed significantly to the advancement of the engineering profession.

== Education ==
Elaine Surick is the daughter of Herman E. Surick and the stepdaughter of Doris Luterman-Surick. She is married to Daniel Oran.

Elaine Surick attended school in Philadelphia, Pennsylvania. Bryn Mawr College awarded her a bachelor's degree in both physics and chemistry (1966). She then attended Yale University, where she received a master's degree from the department of physics (1968) and a Ph.D. from the department of engineering and applied sciences (1972).

== U.S. Naval Research Lab ==
Elaine Oran joined the Plasma Physics Division at United States Naval Research Laboratory (NRL) in 1972. In 1978, she joined the Laboratory for Computational Physics. She worked to start the Center for Reactive Flow and Dynamical Systems, and became its head. In 1988, she became the senior scientist for reactive flow physics.

She has done significant theoretical and computational research on complex dynamic systems' fluid and molecular properties. Her team has created many numerical algorithms and computerized models for accurate numerical simulation of reactive flows. Because reactive flows occur in a broad range of important phenomena, Oran's work has enabled other investigators to examine and describe many previously unexplained reactive flow dynamics.

Reactive flows can involve gases, liquids, solids, or combinations thereof. As these move through space and over time, they may change chemically. Reactive flow problems often involve multiple processes interacting simultaneously. Identifying the boundary conditions where states of matter react and how they interact is important in modeling reactive flows. Physical processes involved in reactive flows include species reactions, diffusive transport, radiative transport, convection, and wave-like properties, some or all of which may be modeled to address a particular problem. Modelling of complex reactive flows has applications in a wide variety of areas including aerodynamics, hydrodynamics, microfluidics, chemical kinetics, chemical process modeling (involving advective and diffusive transport processes as well as chemical kinetics) and combustion-related flame and detonation phenomena.

Reactive flow modeling can be applied to solar and stellar astrophysics to study novae, star formation, and cosmology. It can model mixing in Earth's atmosphere, rarefied gas flow during atmospheric reentry, torpedo launches in the Earth's oceans, the spread of fires in cities and forests, and the behavior of car engines and chemical lasers.

Oran has applied simulation methods to various issues at the Naval Research Lab. She has helped to design biosensors, propulsion systems for rockets and jets, and space and planetary exploration vehicles. She has studied the fundamental physics of combustion processes, applying flow models to flames, detonations, and the conditions underlying the transition to denotation. Her work has supported the safe storage of hydrogen fuels and other energetic materials.

== Aerospace engineering ==
She is currently a professor at Texas A&M University. She worked at the department of aerospace engineering at the University of Maryland as a Glenn L. Martin Institute Professor of Engineering from 2013 to 2019. She continues to serve as an emeritus scientist at the U.S. Naval Research Laboratory and is an adjunct professor at the University of Michigan and a visiting professor at Leeds University. She is also a senior visiting professor in the Institute for Advanced Study at Hong Kong University of Science and Technology and a distinguished visiting professor at Tsinghua University.

== Publications ==
She has published extensively in journals and has written a textbook, Numerical Simulation of Reactive Flow (1987, 2005), which is reported to be the most frequently used textbook on the topic.

== Awards and honors ==
Among many other awards and honors, Elaine Oran is an Honorary Fellow of the American Institute of Aeronautics and Astronautics (AIAA), "the highest distinction conferred by AIAA, … granted to preeminent individuals who have had long and highly contributory careers in aerospace, and embody the highest possible standards in aeronautics and astronautics." She is a Fellow of the American Academy of Arts and Sciences, National Academy of Engineering and an inaugural Fellow of The Combustion Institute.

Other awards, honors, and honorary memberships include, but are not limited to, the following:

=== Awards ===
- Hoyt C. Hottel Keynote lecture at the International Combustion Symposium, 2014
- Fluid Dynamics Prize (APS), 2013, from the American Physical Society (APS)
- Presidential Rank Award for Distinguished Senior Professionals, from the United States Government, for exceptional long-term accomplishments, 2007
- Society of Women Engineers Achievement Award, 2006
- Dryden Lectureship in Research Award from American Institute of Aeronautics and Astronautics, 2002
- Women in Technology International (WITI) Hall of Fame, 2002
- Combustion Institute's Zeldovich Gold Medal, 2000, for "outstanding contributions to the theory of combustion and detonations."
- Oppenheim Prize, 1999, given by the Institute for the Dynamics of Energetic and Reactive Systems, for "outstanding contributions to the theory of the dynamics of explosions and reactive systems."
- Arthur S. Flemming Award, 1979

=== Honorary degrees ===
- Doctor of Science, honoris causa (DSc) from the University of Leeds, conferred 15 July 2010
- Docteur Honoris Causa from the École Centrale de Lyon, 2006
- Docteur Honoris Causa, Institut National des Sciences Appliquées Rouen, conferred on 3 April 2015.

=== Memberships ===
- Elected an international fellow of the Royal Academy of Engineering, 2024
- Fellow, American Academy of Arts and Sciences, 2018
- Fellow, The Combustion Institute, 2018
- Member, Committee on Human Rights, National Academies of Science, Engineering and Medicine
- Fellow of the American Society of Mechanical Engineers (ASME), 2012
- Advisory Board, Acta Mechanica Sinica, 2011–Present
- Honorary Fellow of the American Institute of Aeronautics and Astronautics (AIAA), 2011
- Fellow of the Society for Industrial and Applied Mathematics (SIAM), 2009 (charter member)
- Member of the National Academy of Engineering, 2003, "the highest honor to which any aerospace engineer can aspire."
- Fellowship in the American Physical Society (APS), 1993, "for innovations using cutting edge computers to model and explain important physical mechanisms involving fluid dynamics, chemistry, and nonequilibrium material properties in complex reacting flows ranging from laboratory to astrophysical systems."
- Fellow of the American Institute of Aeronautics and Astronautics (AIAA), 1990
- Society of Women Engineers
