= St Helen's Church, Thorganby =

Church in Thorganby, North Yorkshire, England

Coordinates: 53°51′59″N 0°57′10″W

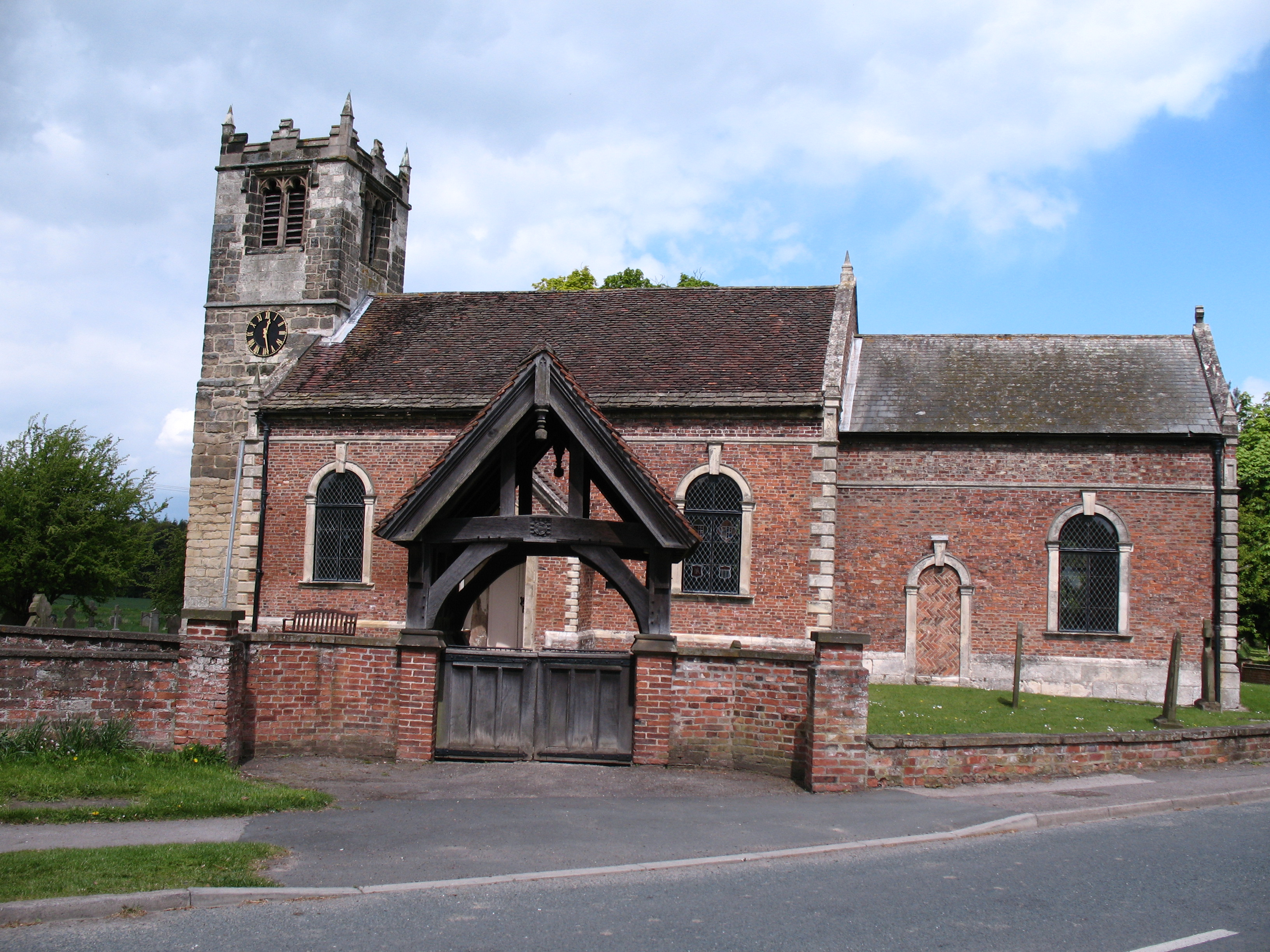
The church, in 2010

St Helen's Church is the parish church of Thorganby, a village in the county of North Yorkshire, in England.

A church in Thorganby was first recorded in 1228, but by 1312 it was regarded as only a chapel in the parish of Aughton. It became a church with its own parish again after the Dissolution of the Monasteries.

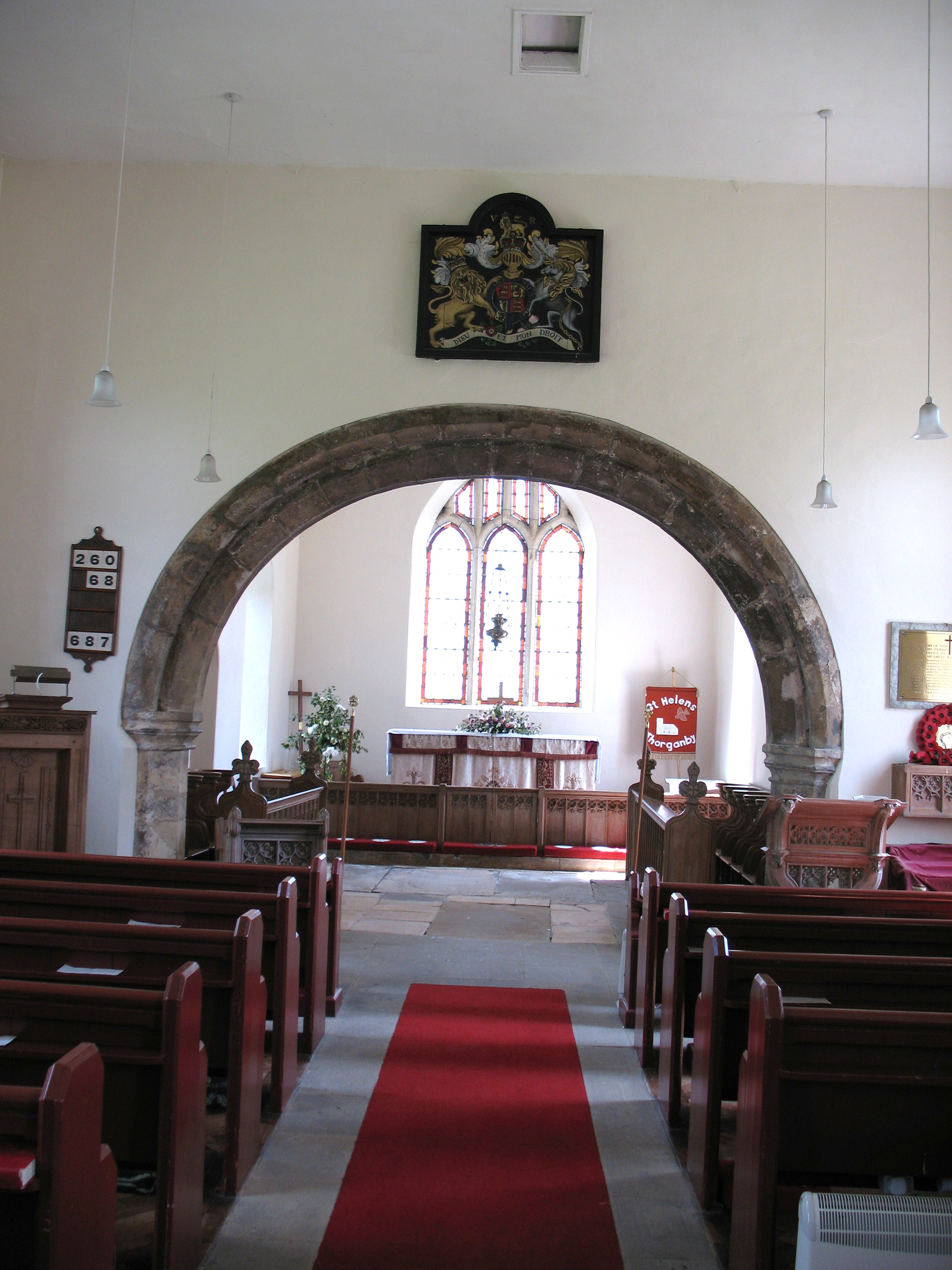
View from the nave into the chancel

The oldest part of the church may be the chancel arch, which has been tentatively dated to the mid-14th century. The tower, which is built of Magnesian Limestone, probably dates from the 15th century. The remainder of the church was rebuilt in brick: the nave and south porch in 1710, followed in 1719 by the chancel. All the windows have round arches, other than the east window, which is in the Perpendicular style. There is an early-19th-century vestry on the north side of the church. The church was restored in about 1955. In 1966, it was Grade I listed.

Inside the church is a font, which is octagonal and probably dates from the late 17th century. There is a mediaeval stone slab memorial to Alice Saltmarsh, a Victorian coat of arms painted on wood, and a wooden plaque from 1821 which records the church's benefactors. There are three bells, one undated, and the other two dating from 1666 and 1738.

Francis Annesley, 1st Viscount Valentia is buried in the churchyard of St. Helens.

== See also ==
- Grade I listed buildings in North Yorkshire (district)
- Listed buildings in Thorganby, North Yorkshire
