= Listed buildings in Thorganby, North Yorkshire =

Thorganby is a civil parish in the county of North Yorkshire, England. It contains 15 listed buildings that are recorded in the National Heritage List for England. Of these, one is listed at Grade I, the highest of the three grades, and the others are at Grade II, the lowest grade. The parish contains the village of Thorganby and the surrounding countryside. The most important listed building is the church, most of the rest are houses and associated structures, and the other listed building consists of piers from a former drawbridge.

== Key ==
Grade	Criteria
I	Buildings of exceptional interest, sometimes considered to be internationally important
II	Buildings of national importance and special interest

== Buildings ==
Name and location	Photograph	Date	Notes	Grade
St Helen's Church; 53.86642°N 0.95278°W		15th century (probable)	The oldest part of the church is the tower, which is in magnesian limestone, and the rest of the church is in pinkish-orange brick with stone dressings; the nave and porch were rebuilt in 1710 and the chancel in 1719. The church consists of a nave, a south porch, a chancel with a north vestry, and a west tower. The tower has three stages, a plinth, string courses, a small two-light mullioned west window and slit windows. On the south front is a clock face, the bell openings have two trefoil-headed lights, and above is an embattled parapet with corner pinnacles. Most of the windows on the body of the church have round-arched heads, imposts and keystones, and the east window has a pointed head and three lights.	I
West Cottingwith Hall; 53.87085°N 0.94669°W	—	Early to mid-18th century	The house is in pinkish-brown brick on a plinth, with red brick dressings, a floor band, a dentilled eaves band, and a hipped pantile roof. There are two storeys, a square plan and three bays. Steps lead up to a doorway with a decorative fanlight, and the windows are sashes with flat arches of gauged brick.	II
Piers to North Hills Drawbridge; 53.87598°N 0.93921°W	—	18th century	The surviving piers of the former drawbridge are in timber, and consist of five rows of piers parallel to the bank of the River Derwent.	II
Yew Tree Farm; 53.86262°N 0.95269°W	—	Mid to late 18th century	The house is in pinkish-brown brick, with a floor band, a dentilled eaves band, and a pantile roof with brick coped gables. There are two storeys and three bays. The central doorway has a fanlight, and the windows are sashes under elliptical arches.	II
Thorganby Hall; 53.86603°N 0.95241°W		1822	The house is in gault brick, with red brick at the rear, a plinth, stone dressings, a floor band, a cornice, and a hipped Welsh slate roof. There are two storeys and three bays, the middle bay projecting slightly under a pediment containing a coat of arms. In the centre is a distyle Ionic portico with a dentilled frieze and a pediment, and a doorway with an ornamental fanlight. This flanked by oval windows, and the other windows are sashes with wedge lintels and fluted keystones.	II
Coach house, hayloft and dovecote, Thorganby Hall; 53.86635°N 0.95201°W	—	c. 1822	The building is in pinkish-brown brick, with red brick dressings and a Welsh slate roof, and it consists of a three-storey central bay flanked by two-storey wings. In the centre is a round-arched carriage entrance in red gauged brick, and above is a round-arched window and two rows of dove openings with landing shelves. The roof is hipped, and has a square cupola with dove holes and a weathervane. The roofs of the wings have stone coping and kneelers, and contain doorways with oculi above.	II
Gates and piers to stable yard, Thorganby Hall; 53.86641°N 0.95239°W	—	c. 1822	The entrance to the stable yard is flanked by square brick piers with stone coping, about 1.5 metres (4 ft 11 in) in height. The gates are in cast iron, and have three levels of rails with bars, and dog bars with lance heads. There are diamond and arch braces.	II
Gates, piers and wall to Thorganby Hall; 53.86617°N 0.95265°W		c. 1822	The gates at the entrance to the drive are in cast iron, and have three levels of rails with bars, and dog bars with lance heads. There are diamond and arch braces. The gate pier is in stone, and is cylindrical. Attached to it is a wall in gault brick with stone coping, about 1 metre (3 ft 3 in) in height and 1.5 metres (4 ft 11 in) in height, and at its end is a square pier.	II
Stables, Thorganby Hall; 53.86618°N 0.95194°W	—	1822 (probable)	The stable range, later used for other purposes, is in pinkish-brown brick, with red brick dressings, and a grey slate roof with stone coping and kneelers. There are two storeys and twelve bays. On the ground floor is a doorway with a fanlight, blocked doorways and casement windows, all under flat arches of red rubbed brick. On the upper floor are twelve oculi with red brick surrounds, two infilled with brick.	II
Garden Cottage; 53.88268°N 0.93816°W	—	c. 1844	The cottage, designed by Edward Blore, is in orange-red brick on a plinth, with stone dressings, quoins, a modillion eaves cornice, and a grey slate roof with stone coping, kneelers and a finial. There is an L-shaped plan, with a range of a single storey and two bays, and a two-storey single gabled range at right angles. In the centre is a gabled porch with quoins, and a doorway with a Tudor arch, quoined jambs and a hood mould, and to the left is a mullioned and transomed window. The other range has a canted bay window.	II
Thicket Priory; 53.88338°N 0.94113°W		1844–47	A country house designed by Edward Blore, and later used for other purposes, it is in orange-red brick with stone dressings and a grey slate roof. The garden front is mainly in two storeys, with eight bays, a four-stage tower, a three-stage stair turret, and a chapel at the northeast corner. The left doorway has a double-chamfered surround, quoinedjambs and a hood mould, and the right doorway has a Tudor arch. Most of the windows are mullioned and transomed with chamfered surrounds and quoined jambs, some with hood moulds.	II
Coach houses, stables and brewery, Thicket Priory; 53.88400°N 0.94121°W	—	1844–47	The buildings are in orange-red brick with stone dressings and a grey slate roof, and form a quadrangular plan. The entrance is through a Tudor arch with chamfered jambs and a hood mould. The stables each have two storeys and five bays, and the coach houses have a single storey and five bays. On the left is a square tower, and the fourth side is occupied by a brewery with two storeys and a single bay, and a tent roof.	II
Lodge, Thicket Priory; 53.88289°N 0.94733°W		c. 1845	The lodge at the entry to the drive was designed by Edward Blore, and is in pinkish-orange brick with a Welsh slate roof. There are two storeys, a cruciform plan, and one pedimented bay on each side. The windows are sashes, those on the ground floor with cambered heads, and most with moulded sills, and those on the upper floor are horizontally sliding.	II
Hedley House; 53.86191°N 0.95823°W	—	1845	The house is built in orange-red brick on a plinth, with stone dressings, quoins, a grey slate roof, and ornamental gables with stone coping and kneelers. There are two storeys and two bays. On the front is a doorway with a quoined surround and a stepped hood mould. The windows on the ground floor are sashes with quoined surrounds and hood moulds, and on the upper floor are casement windows, one with a hood mould. To the right is a projecting chimney stack with quoins.	II
Thorganby House; 53.86832°N 0.95205°W	—	c. 1850	The house is in orange-red brick with stone dressings, quoins, a modillion eaves band, and a Welsh slate roof with gables, stone coping, kneelers and finials. There are two storeys and three bays. The main doorway has a chamfered surround and a fanlight, and is in a basket-arched architrave. The windows are sashes, some are single lights, and others are in mullioned windows.	II
