= William Walsh (educationist) =

William Walsh (23 February 1916 – 23 June 1996) was successively Professor of Education, Professor of Commonwealth Literature and Acting Vice-Chancellor at the University of Leeds.

== Early life and education ==
Walsh graduated in English from Downing College, Cambridge in 1943 where he was taught by F. R. Leavis. He then worked as a schoolmaster at Raynes Park Grammar School whilst studying for an MA in Education at the University of London, which he achieved in 1951.

== Academic career ==
In 1951 Walsh became a lecturer in education at the University College of North Staffordshire (now Keele University). Two years later he moved to a similar post at the University of Edinburgh.

In 1957 Walsh was appointed professor and head of the Department of Education at the University of Leeds.

Walsh served as pro-vice-chancellor at Leeds from 1965 to 1967.

In 1972 Walsh was appointed professor of Commonwealth literature in the School of English, also at Leeds University.

Following the death in September 1981 of the incumbent Vice-Chancellor, Lord Boyle of Handsworth, Walsh delayed his retirement and served for two years from 1981 to 1983 as acting vice-chancellor. Walsh retired from Leeds in 1983 with the title emeritus professor and was succeeded as vice-chancellor by Sir Edward Parkes. Walsh was awarded the degree of Doctor of Laws (LLD) honoris causa in 1984.

Walsh gave the 1983 John Keats Memorial Lecture.

== Personal life ==
Walsh married May Watson in 1945. They had a son and daughter.

== Death ==
Walsh died in Leeds on 23 June 1996, aged 80.

Academic offices
| Preceded by Edward Boyle | (Acting) Vice-Chancellor, University of Leeds; 1981-1983 | Succeeded by Edward Parkes |
