= Thicket Priory =

Monastery in Thorganby, North Yorkshire, England

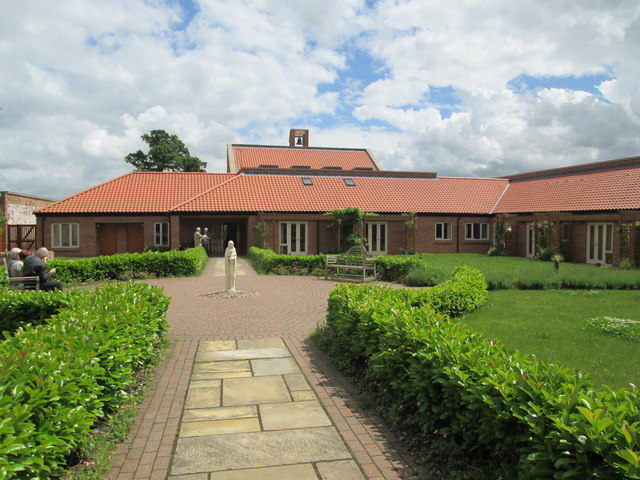
- Interactive map of Thicket Priory

Monastery information
- Full name: Thicket Priory
- Order: Discalced Carmelites
- Established: 1955
- Dedication: Carmel of the Annunciation
- Diocese: Middlesbrough

Site
- Location: Thorganby, North Yorkshire
- Coordinates: 53.88302°N 0.94115°W
- Grid reference: SE 69702 43562

Thicket Priory is a religious house in the civil parish of Thorganby, North Yorkshire, England, located about 7 miles (11.3 km) south-east of York. It lies in the Roman Catholic Diocese of Middlesbrough.

== Description ==
A Benedictine priory for nuns stood on the site of Thicket Priory from the 1180s and was dissolved in 1539, its building being demolished in 1850. There is also evidence of a devotion to ‘Our Lady of Thicket’ dating from this time.

New monastic buildings were erected in the grounds of the former establishment, and these re-founded as a Carmelite monastery in 2009.

The building that was used by the community until 2009 was erected as a country house between 1844 and 1847, and was sold by Lt Col Sir John Dunnington-Jefferson in 1955 to the Carmelite Sisters of Exmouth. This group of buildings holds three Grade II listed buildings: the former house itself, its lodge, and coach house with stables and brewery,

The building was up for sale in April 2013, with an asking price of £3,000,000. As of January 2014, the estate had been reduced to £2,500,000. It was converted to a large private house about this time; the nuns moved into a new purpose-built convent in 2009.

== Interior and grounds ==
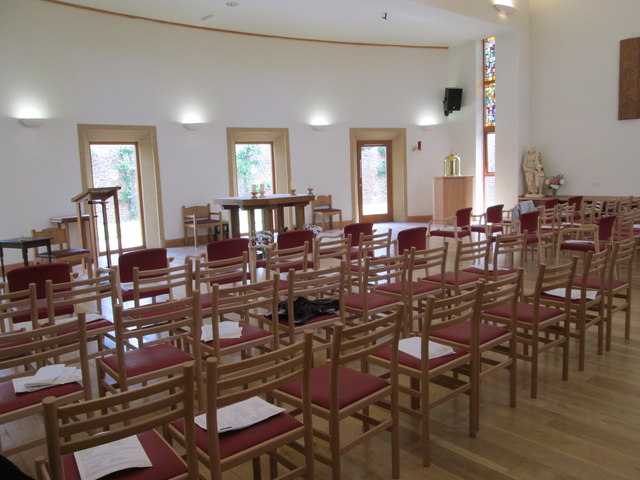
Chapel

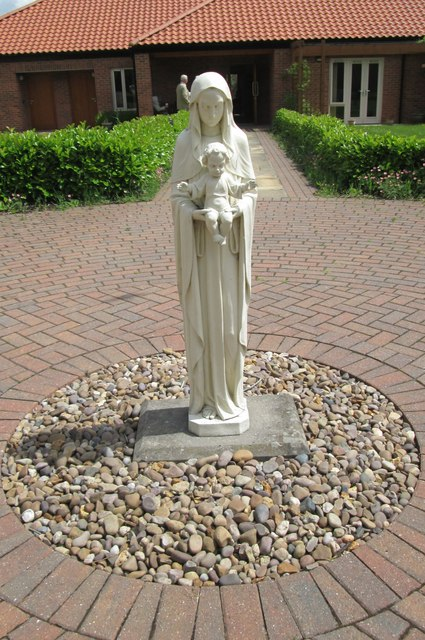
Statue

== See also ==
- Listed buildings in Thorganby, North Yorkshire
- More House, York.
