= Claudius Galen Wheelhouse =

English physician and photographer

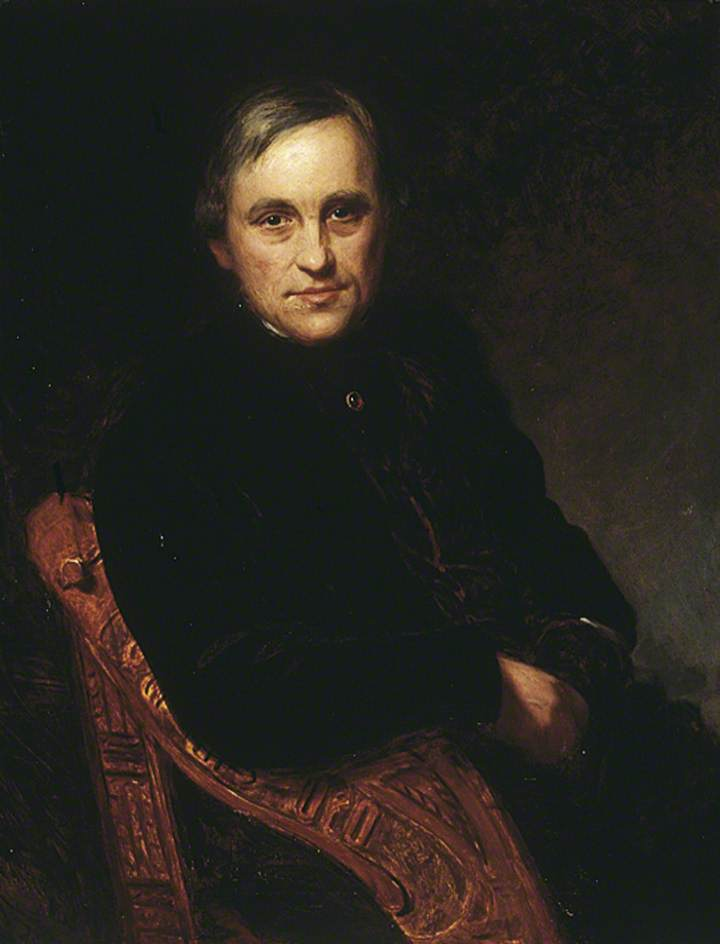
- Born: 29 December 1826; Yorkshire
- Died: 9 April 1909 (aged 82); Filey
- Occupations: Physician and photographer

Claudius Galen Wheelhouse (29 December 1826 – 9 April 1909) was an English physician and photographer.

== Biography ==
Wheelhouse was born at Snaith in Yorkshire on 29 December 1826, was second son of James Wheelhouse, surgeon. At seven he left the grammar school at Snaith for Christ's Hospital preparatory school at Hertford, and entered Christ's Hospital in London in 1836. He was apprenticed at sixteen to R. C. Ward of Ollerton, Newark, and always strongly advocated the system of apprenticeship. He entered the Leeds school of medicine in October 1846, and was admitted M.R.C.S. England on 25 March 1849, and a licentiate of the Society of Apothecaries in 1850. He then went to the Mediterranean on a yachting cruise as surgeon to Lord Lincoln, afterwards fifth duke of Newcastle and secretary of state for war. He took with him one of the first photographic cameras which left England, and obtained many good photographs in spite of the cumbrous processes.

Wheelhouse returned to England in 1851, and entered into partnership with Joseph Prince Garlick of Park Row, Leeds, the senior surgeon to the dispensary and lecturer on surgery at the Leeds school of medicine. In the same year he was elected surgeon to the public dispensary and demonstrator of anatomy in the medical school, where he was successively lecturer on anatomy, physiology, and surgery. He was twice president of the school, and when the new university of Leeds was inaugurated in October 1904 Wheelhouse was made hon. D.Sc. He was surgeon to the Leeds infirmary from March 1884.

Elected F.R.C.S. England on 9 June 1864, he served on the college council from 1876 to 1881. President of the council of the British Medical Association 1881–4, he presided at the Leeds meeting in 1889. In 1897, when the association held its annual meeting at Montreal, McGill College made him hon. LL.D., and he received the gold medal of the association.

In 1886, when the Medical Act brought direct representatives of the profession on the general medical council, Wheelhouse headed the poll in England and Wales. Re-elected in 1891 at the end of his term, he did not seek re-election in 1897. From 1870 to 1895 he was first secretary and afterwards treasurer of the West Riding Medical Charity, and in 1902 he was presented by his fellow members with an address of thanks and testimonial.

On retiring from practice at Leeds in 1891 he settled at Filey, where he was active in local affairs. He died at Filey on 9 April 1909, and was buried there. He married in 1860 Agnes Caroline, daughter of Joseph Cowell, vicar of Todmorden, and had issue three daughters.

Wheelhouse filled the unusual position of a general practitioner who made a name in pure surgery. An admirable teacher, he did much to convert the Leeds medical school into a worthy integral part of the university. In 1876 he advocated that form of external urethrotomy for impermeable strictures to which his name is given (Wheelhouse's Method); it displaced all rival methods. The operation was first described in the ‘British Medical Journal,’ 1876, i. 779, in a paper entitled ‘Perineal section as performed at Leeds.’
