= Thomas Newbigging =

Scottish historian, writer and engineer

Thomas Newbigging (30 September 1833 – 1 June 1914) was a Scottish historian, writer and engineer.

== Early life ==
Newbigging was born in 1833 in Glasgow, Scotland, and was raised initially in Gatehouse of Fleet. When he was 11, his family moved to Blackburn, Lancashire and then to Bury in 1849. When he was in Blackburn, he began working as an engineering apprentice.

== Engineering career ==
Between 1851 and 1870, Newbigging lived in the district of Rossendale, spending most of this time as secretary and manager of the Rossendale Union Gas Company. In 1870, he published The Gas Manager's Handbook, a reference work outlining guidelines for the management of gas supplies. The handbook was well-used, and was reprinted in at least 8 editions.

After this, Newbigging travelled to Brazil, where he worked as an Engineer and Manager for the Pernambuco Gasworks. After returning in England in 1875, he began practising as an engineering consultant in Manchester. He became known as a leading authority on gas engineering. He was a founding member of the British Association of Gas Managers and, in 1885, President of the Gas Institute. In 1912, the University of Leeds awarded him an honorary Doctor of Science degree.

== Politics ==
Newbigging represented the Liberal Party in the Rossendale Division in the 1886 General Election, losing to Lord Hartington. A collection of his speeches from his contest was published, together with other addresses, in an 1887 volume.

== Writing ==
Outside of his professional writings, Newbigging wrote further works as a poet and historian.

- Poems and Songs
- History of the Forest of Rossendale (1893)

Other works include a biography of Lancashire composer James Leach.

== Personal life ==
Newbigging married Hannah Lomax in 1859, and they had three sons and two daughters. He died in Knutsford on 1 June 1914.
