= Dunnington-Jefferson baronets =

Baronetcy in the Baronetage of the United Kingdom

The Dunnington-Jefferson Baronetcy, of Thorganby Hall in the East Riding of the County of York, is a title in the Baronetage of the United Kingdom. It was created on 7 July 1958 for Lieutenant-Colonel John Dunnington-Jefferson. As of 2014 the title is held by his grandson, the third Baronet, who succeeded in that year.

== Dunnington-Jefferson baronets, of Thorganby Hall (1958) ==
- Sir John Alexander Dunnington-Jefferson, 1st Baronet (1884–1979)
- Sir Mervyn Stewart Dunnington-Jefferson, 2nd Baronet (1943–2014)
- Sir John Alexander Dunnington-Jefferson, 3rd Baronet (born 1980)
