= Thorganby, North Yorkshire =

Village and civil parish in North Yorkshire, England

Coordinates: 53°52′12″N 0°57′01″W

Thorganby
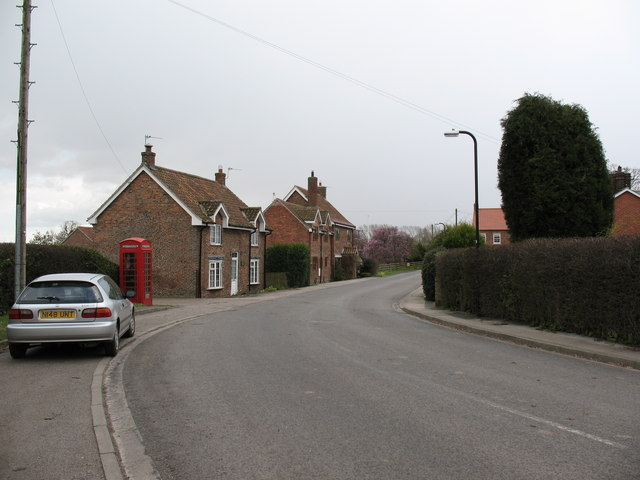
- Main street, Thorganby

- Location within North Yorkshire
- Population: 330 (2011 census)
- OS grid reference: SE691420
- Unitary authority: North Yorkshire
- Ceremonial county: North Yorkshire
- Region: Yorkshire and the Humber
- Country: England
- Sovereign state: United Kingdom
- Post town: YORK
- Postcode district: YO19
- Police: North Yorkshire
- Fire: North Yorkshire
- Ambulance: Yorkshire

Thorganby is a small village and civil parish in North Yorkshire, England. It was historically part of the East Riding of Yorkshire until 1974, but from 1974 to 2023 was in the Selby District of the shire county of North Yorkshire. In 2023 the district was abolished and North Yorkshire became a unitary authority.

It is situated 3 miles (4.8 km) from the village of Wheldrake. According to the 2011 census the village had 330 residents. Children in the village attend Wheldrake with Thorganby C of E (Aided) Primary School, located in Wheldrake.

== History ==
The village is mentioned in the Domesday Book of 1086 as Torgrembi, and was listed as belonging to Ralph Paynel, the lord in chief of the area. Thorganby derives from a personal name Thorgrim and the Old Norse bȳ, meaning farmstead or village.

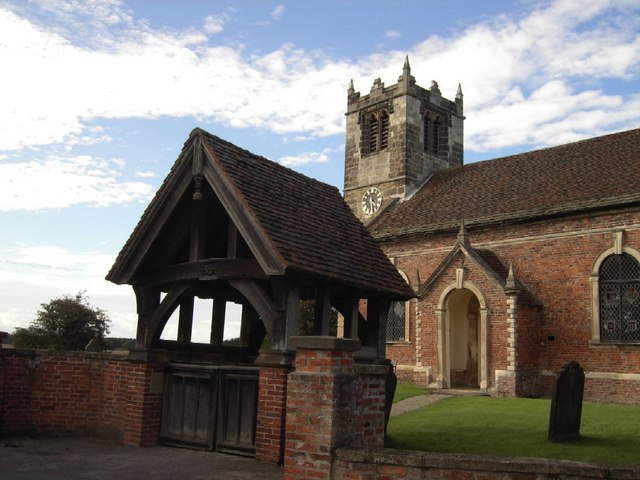
St Helen’s Church, Thorganby

A church is first recorded in 1228, when the advowson was appointed to Robert de Meynell. However, the present structure, St Helen's Church, which is a grade I listed building, dates from the 15th century. The church is in the ecclesiastical parish of Thorganby, which is in the Diocese of York.

Francis Annesley, 1st Viscount Valentia is buried in the churchyard of St. Helens.

The village was in the Selby District of North Yorkshire, but was previously in the Ouse and Derwent Wapentake of the East Riding of Yorkshire. But in 2023 the district was abolished and North Yorkshire became a unitary authority.

The village is on the west bank of the River Derwent and is across the river from the Lower Derwent National Nature Reserve.

The nearest railway station in the 19th century was Escrick, some 5 miles (8 km) to the west. However, in 1913, Thorganby gained its own station on the newly opened Derwent Valley Light Railway, which provided a link between York and Selby. The station closed in 1926 to passengers, but remained open until 1964 for goods traffic.

In the 2001 census, the parish had 241 residents, and increasing by the 2011 census to 330. In 2015, North Yorkshire County Council estimated the population to have risen again to 350.

Film star Robert Redford visited a pub in the village with friends in March 2011 while in the UK to promote the Sundance London Film Festival.

== See also ==
- Listed buildings in Thorganby, North Yorkshire
