= SML =

SML may refer to:

== Economics ==
- Sammarinese lira (ISO 4217 code)
- Security market line, a representation of the capital asset pricing model
- Sistema de Pagamentos em Moeda Local, local currency payment system
- Canadian Silver Maple Leaf, abbreviated as SML

== Organisations and businesses ==
- Scottish Militant Labour, 1990s Trotskyist political party
- SML Isuzu, commercial vehicle manufacturer, India
- Soheil Mosun, architectural manufacturer and design-build company, Toronto, Canada
- Sony Music Latin, an American record label
- Strasser Marigaux & Lemaire, French musical instrument manufacturer

== Places ==
- South Manchester Line, a tram line of the Manchester Metrolink, England
- Sterling Memorial Library, Yale University, New Haven, Connecticut, US
- St Mary's Church, Longfleet, Dorset, England

== Science and technology ==
- Sea surface microlayer, the top millimeter of the ocean surface
- Shoals Marine Laboratory, a seasonal marine field station on Appledore Island, Maine, U.S.
- Standard ML, a programming language
- Service Modeling Language, to allow computing applications to communicate

== Other uses ==
- SML, a jazz quintet composed of Gregory Uhlmann, Josh Johnson, Jeremiah Chiu, Anna Butterss, and Booker Stardrum
- Super Mario Land, a video game for the Game Boy
- Survey Motor Launches, decommissioned survey vessels of the Royal Navy
- Suriname Major League, top division association football league in Suriname
