= George Brown (footballer, born 1883) =

English footballer

Personal information
- Full name: George Samuel Brown
- Date of birth: January qtr. 1883
- Place of birth: Longfleet St Mary, Poole, England
- Position: Left back

Senior career*
Years	Team	Apps	(Gls)
- Longfleet St Mary's
1910	Southampton	2	(0)
1910–19??	Longfleet St Mary's		
- * Club domestic league appearances and goals

George Samuel Brown (born 1883) was an English amateur footballer who made two appearances for Southampton in the Southern League in 1910. His full-time occupation was as a fisherman.

== Football career ==
Brown was born in the Longfleet St Mary parish of Poole and had represented the Dorset County F.A. In March 1910, he was invited to The Dell for a trial; considered "up to scratch", he took the place of Horace Glover at left-back (Glover had moved to centre-forward in the absence of Charlie McGibbon) for the Southern League match at Bristol Rovers on 26 March 1910. Described as "tall, weighty and muscular", Brown played well enough to earn another match, a week later, at home to Norwich City.

Despite acquitting himself well in his two first-team appearances, Brown decided to abandon his football career and resume his profession as a fisherman, although he continued to play for his local club, earning a trial with the England amateur team in January 1911.
