= Longfleet St Mary's F.C. =

Association football club in England

- Full name: Longfleet St Mary's Football Club
- Founded: 1887
- Dissolved: 2004
- Ground: Whitecliffe Recreation Ground, Poole
Home colours	Away colours

Longfleet St Mary's F.C. were a long running amateur football club based in Longfleet, a suburb of Poole — a coastal town and seaport in Dorset.

In existence for over a hundred years, the club were long standing members of the Dorset League and Dorset Combination, and prior the outbreak of the Great War enjoyed much success.

== History ==
Longfleet St Mary's were formed in 1887 as the football team side of St Mary's Church.

They spent their early days playing friendly fixtures before becoming founder members of the Bournemouth & District League, winning the title in 1903 and performing well in the Dorset Cup competitions. This then saw them progress on the Hampshire League, which at the time was organised on a regional basis. 'The Saints' were placed in the West Division and were champions on four occasions.

During this time, Longfleet also began entering national competitions, and in the FA Cup they twice played future Football League clubs. In 1904 they lost 0–8 against Swindon Town and then four years later when they met Exeter City. They surprisingly held 'the Grecians' to a 1–1 home draw before losing the replay 1–10.

In 1908, the club celebrated their 21st anniversary and produced an impressive souvenir brochure to mark the occasion, listing all their achievements.

After World War I, Longfleet then had spells playing in the Bournemouth League and Dorset League before war broke out again in 1939.

Once the conflict had finally finished, Longfleet reformed and in 1946 they won the Dorset Senior Cup after defeating Portland Dockyard with the final played on Dorchester Town's ground. They then spent a solitary season in the Hampshire League before returning to the Dorset scene where they continued challenging for silverware. There was another memorable FA Cup run during the 1948–49 campaign, progressing through three preliminary rounds before going down 0–4 to a strong Weymouth side in front of a large crowd.

In 1957, Longfleet became founder members of the Dorset Combination (now known today as the Dorset Premier League). They were twice runners-up in the mid sixties and were beaten finalists in the 1972 League Cup - each time coming second best to the all conquering Parley Sports side.

By the early eighties, Longfleet were struggling to retain their long held status and in 1981 they were relegated after finishing bottom of the table. A return to the Dorset League saw further struggles which eventually forced them to disband.

A few years later, Longfleet reformed as a Sunday side and played in the Bournemouth League. Here they won a number of trophies and were regular entrants in the national FA Sunday Cup before eventually calling it a day in 2004.

== Honours ==
- Dorset Football Association
  - Senior Cup Winners 1945/46
- Dorset Combination
  - Runners-up 1963–64 and 1964–65
  - League Cup Finalists 1971–72
- Dorset League
  - Division 1 Runners-up
  - Division 2 Runners-up
- Hampshire League
  - West Division Champions 1903–04, 1905–06, 1907–08 and 1908–09. Runners-up 1904–05
- Bournemouth & District League
  - Division 1 Champions 1902–03

== Playing Records ==
=== League ===
Season	Division	Position	Significant events
1903–04	Hampshire League West Division	1/8	Champions
1904–05	Hampshire League West Division	2/9	
1905–06	Hampshire League West Division	1/7	Champions
1906–07	Hampshire League West Division	6/7	
1907–08	Hampshire League West Division	1/8	Champions
1908–09	Hampshire League West Division	1/7	Champions
1909–10	Hampshire League West Division	5/7	
1910–11	Hampshire League West Division	5/8	
1911–12	Hampshire League West Division	6/8	
1912–13	Hampshire League West Division	7/8	
1913–14	Hampshire League West Division	7/9	Left competition
1919–39			
1946–47	Hampshire League Division 3	5/12	left competition
1947–57			
1957–58	Dorset Combination	?	
1958–59	Dorset Combination	?	
1959–60	Dorset Combination	?	
1960–61	Dorset Combination	?	
1961–62	Dorset Combination	?	
1962–63	Dorset Combination	?	
1963–64	Dorset Combination	2nd	
1964–65	Dorset Combination	2nd	
1965–66	Dorset Combination	?	
1966–67	Dorset Combination	?	
1967–68	Dorset Combination	?	
1968–69	Dorset Combination	?	
1969–70	Dorset Combination	?	
1970–71	Dorset Combination	?	
1971–72	Dorset Combination	?	League Cup finalists
1972–73	Dorset Combination	?	
1973–74	Dorset Combination	?	
1974–75	Dorset Combination	?	
1975–76	Dorset Combination	?	
1976–77	Dorset Combination	?	
1977–78	Dorset Combination	?	
1978–79	Dorset Combination	?	
1979–80	Dorset Combination	13/18	
1980–81	Dorset Combination	18/18	Relegated

=== FA Cup ===
Season	Round	Opponents	Result
1903–04	2nd Qualifying Round	H v Yeovil Casuals	W 4-1
	2nd Qualifying Round	H v Freemantle	L 1-2
1904-05	1st Qualifying Round	H v Poole Town	W 3-2
	2nd Qualifying Round	H v Yeovil Casuals	W 2-1
	3rd Qualifying Round	H v Weymouth	W 1-0
	4th Qualifying Round	A v Swindon Town	L 0–8
1905–06	1st Qualifying Round	H v North Hants Ironworks	L 0-2
1906–07	1st Qualifying Round	H v Poole Town	L 0-1
1907–08	1st Qualifying Round	A v Weymouth	W 4-0
	2nd Qualifying Round	H v Portland Prison Officers	D 2-2
	Replay	A v Portland Prison Officers	L 1-3
1908–09	1st Qualifying Round	H Yeovil Town	W 4-2
	2nd Qualifying Round	H v Exeter City	D 1–1
	Replay	A v Exeter City	L 1–10
1909–10	1st Qualifying Round	A v Shaftesbury	L 2-4
1910–11	1st Qualifying Round	A v Bournemouth Gasworks	L 3-4
1911–12	1st Qualifying Round	A v Weymouth	L 0-2
1912–13	Preliminary Round	A v South Farnborough Athletic	D 5-5
	Replay	H v South Farnborough Athletic	L 1-2
1913–14	Preliminary Round	H v Poole Town	D 2-2
	Replay	A v Poole Town	W 1-0
	1st Qualifying Round	A v Gosport United	L 0-6
1914–15	2nd Qualifying Round	H v Cowes	L 2-5
1947–48	Extra-Preliminary Round	A v Weymouth	L 0-4
1948–49	Extra-Preliminary Round	A v Portland United	W 4-2
	Preliminary Round	H v Winchester City	W 4-2
	1st Qualifying Round	H v Thornycroft Athletic	W 4-0
	2nd Qualifying Round	H v Weymouth	L 0-4
1950–51	Extra-Preliminary Round	H v Portland United	L 0-1
1951–52	Extra-Preliminary Round	H v Hamworthy	D 1-1
	Replay	A v Hamworthy	L 0-1

=== FA Amateur Cup ===
Season	Round	Opponents	Result
1903–04	1st Qualifying Round	H v Bournemouth Wanderers	W 5-0
	2nd Qualifying Round	A v Weymouth	W 3-0
	3rd Qualifying Round	A v Paulton Rovers	D 2-2
	Replay	H v Paulton Rovers	L 2-3
1905–06	Preliminary Round	A v Poole Town	W 5-0
	1st Qualifying Round	A v Bournemouth Gasworks	W 4-0
	2nd Qualifying Round	A v Whiteheads	W 3-1
	3rd Qualifying Round	H v Gosport United	L 1-8
1906–07	Extra-Preliminary Round	H v Boscombe	W 3-1
	Preliminary Round	H v Bournemouth Gasworks	D 1-1
	Replay	A v Bournemouth Gasworks	D 1-1
	2nd Replay	H v Bournemouth Gasworks	W 2-1
	1st Qualifying Round	H v Bournemouth	L 1-2
1907–08	1st Qualifying Round	A v Bournemouth Wanderers	L 0-3
1908–09	1st Qualifying Round	H v Boscombe	W 3-1
	2nd Qualifying Round	H v Bournemouth	L 0-3
1909–10	1st Qualifying Round	A v Weymouth	W 1-0
	2nd Qualifying Round	A v Boscombe	D 2-2
	Replay	H v Boscombe	W 4-2
	3rd Qualifying Round	A v Portland United	L 1-3
1910–11	2nd Qualifying Round	H v Boscombe	L 1-6
1911–12	2nd Qualifying Round	A v RGA Weymouth	L 0-2
1912–13	1st Qualifying Round	H v Poole Town	L 1-6
1913–14	2nd Qualifying Round	A v Poole Town	L 2-7
1947–48	Preliminary Round	A v Hamworthy	W 4-0
	1st Qualifying Round	A v Dorchester Town	L 1-3
1948–49	Preliminary Round	H v Bournemouth	W 3-1
	1st Qualifying Round	A v Wimborne Town	L 0-1
1949–50	Extra-Preliminary Round	A v Swanage Town	W 6-1
	Preliminary Round	H v Christchurch	W 6-1
	1st Qualifying Round	H v Wimborne Town	L 4-5
1950-51	Extra-Preliminary Round	A v Hamworthy	W 4-2
	Preliminary Round	A v Alton Town	L 1-5
1951-52	Extra-Preliminary Round	H v Swanage Town	D 0-0
	Replay	A v Swanage Town	W 4-0
	Preliminary Round	A v Bournemouth Gasworks	L 1-3
1952-53	Preliminary Round	H v Winchester City	W 2-1
	1st Qualifying Round	A v Alton Town	L 0-6
1953-54	Preliminary Round	A v Hamworthy	W 2-1
	1st Qualifying Round	A v Lymington Town	L 1-6
1954-55	Preliminary Round	A v Hamworthy	L 2-3
1955-56	Preliminary Round	A v Wimborne Town	L 1-7
1964-65	1st Qualifying Round	H v Waterlooville	L 0-3
1965-66	1st Qualifying Round	H v Pirelli General	L 2-8
1966-67	Preliminary Round	A v Hamworthy	L 0-3
1967-68	1st Qualifying Round	A v Waterlooville	L 0-8
1968-69	1st Qualifying Round	A v Swaythling Athletic	L 0-4
1969-70	1st Qualifying Round	A v Brockenhurst	L 0-3

== Ground ==
Longfleet St Mary's played at Whitecliff Recreation Ground, Poole, BH14 8DU. The venue is owned by BCP Council and is still in use today.

It is believed that their high profile home FA Cup matches were staged at better equipped grounds of neighbours Poole Town and Hamworthy United.

== Notable players ==
Longfleet St Mary's had many fine players over the years. Most notably left-half Alf Weeks who provided "yeoman service" to the team and George Brown, who was born in the area and played for the club before and after signing for Southampton.

== Memorabilia ==
A collection of the club's artefacts and publications still exist and are on display at Poole Museum.

== Local rivalries ==
Longfleet St Mary's had a number of local rivals, most notably Poole Town, Hamworthy United and Bournemouth Gasworks Athletic.

== Successor club ==
Longfleet FC was formed in 1988 and over the years has steadily grown into a well-established club running many teams from boys through to adults.

They are an accredited club and are affiliated to the Dorset County Football Association. The men's Saturday side are members of the Dorset League, whilst the Sunday side were long standing members of the Bournemouth League until 2025 when the competition was taken over by the Dorset League. The club also run a successful ladies team, known as the Longfleet Lionesses who are members of the Dorset Women's League and enter national competitions.

With numerous teams, Longfleet use various pitches in the area for their home games. In 2025 they teamed up with Poole High School to transform the local pitches for the benefit of the community after receiving a generous grant from the Football Foundation.
