= Stock Yards Village =

Shopping centre in The Junction, Toronto, Ontario, Canada

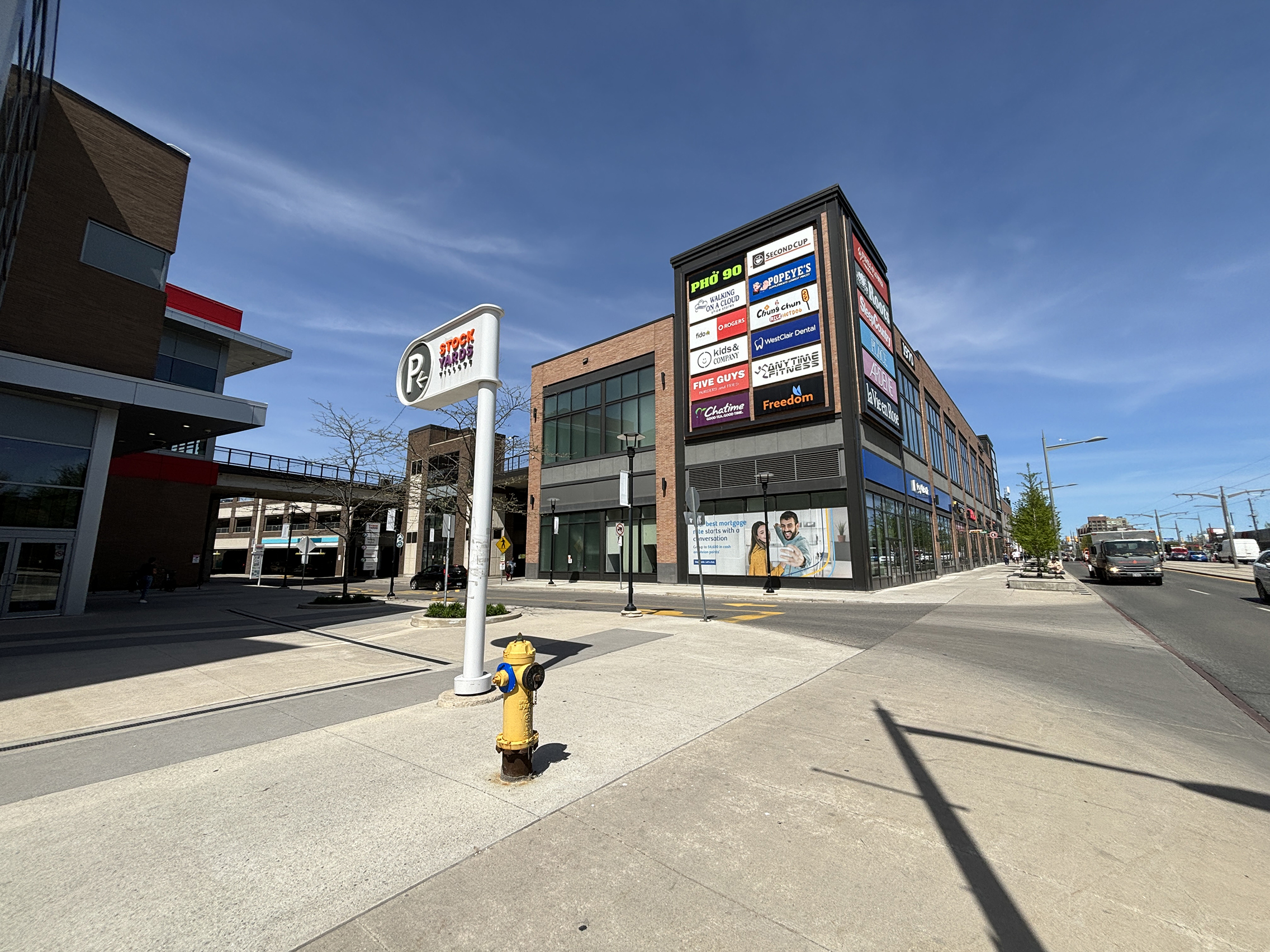
- Stock Yards Village Exterior in 2024
- Location: Toronto, Ontario, Canada
- Coordinates: 43.6728°N 79.4710°W
- Address: 1980 St Clair Avenue West
- Opened: 2014
- Owner: RioCan Real Estate Investment Trust
- Num. of stores: 56
- Floor area: 554,000 square feet (51,500 m^{2})
- Floors: 2
- Website: www.stockyardsvillage.com

Stock Yards Village (commonly misspelled as Stockyards Village) is a shopping centre in Toronto, Ontario, Canada. It is located at Weston Road and St. Clair Avenue West in The Junction neighbourhood. The mall was opened in March 2014 and is anchored by several major stores, including SportChek, Winners, and HomeSense. The mall formerly had a Target from March 2014 to April 2015, and the space was vacant from April 2015 to November 2017, when Nations Fresh Foods opened.

Located in close proximity to Gunns Loop, it is easily accessible by TTC streetcar 512 St. Clair.

== History ==
The site of the mall was once part of the larger Stock Yards area and Swift and Company meat processing plant in Toronto.

== Anchors and majors retailers ==
- Nations Fresh Foods, 153,403 square feet (14,251.6 m^{2}), opened on 16 November 2017
- SportChek, 26,706 square feet (2,481.1 m^{2}), opened summer 2014
- Winners, 32,220 square feet (2,993 m^{2}), opened summer 2014
- Marshalls, 29,018 square feet (2,695.9 m^{2}), opened March 2020
- PetSmart, 15,130 square feet (1,406 m^{2}), opened summer 2014
- HomeSense, 26,586 square feet (2,469.9 m^{2}), opened summer 2014
- Linen Chest, 18,100 square feet (1,680 m^{2}), opened summer 2014
- Michaels, 23,515 square feet (2,184.6 m^{2}), opened summer 2014
- Activate Entertainment, 19,218 square feet (1,785.4 m^{2}), opened on 23 September 2024
- Anytime Fitness, 5,235 square feet (486.3 m^{2}), opened late 2016/early 2017
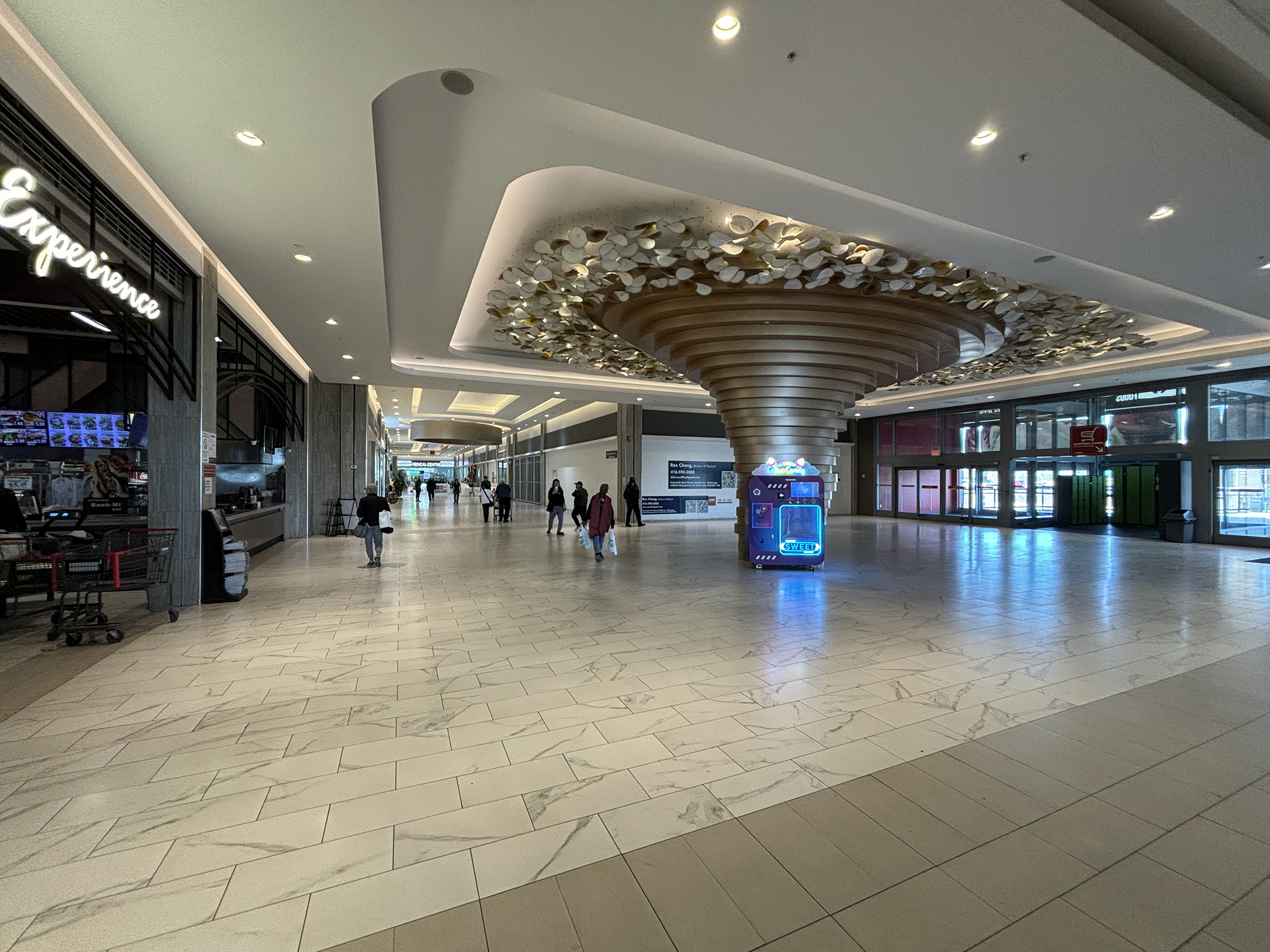
Interior of Nations Fresh Foods

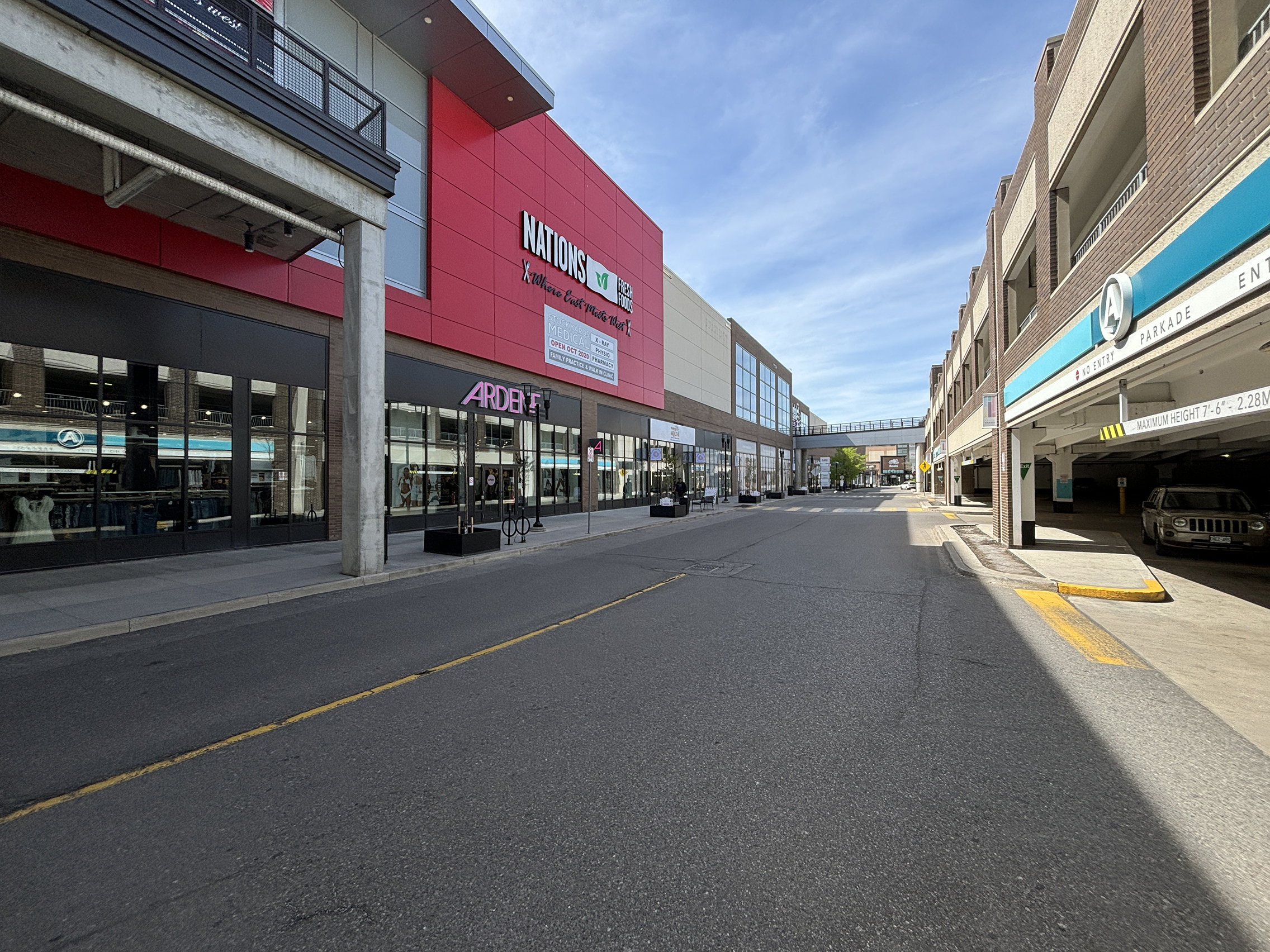
Retail shops linkage to carpark

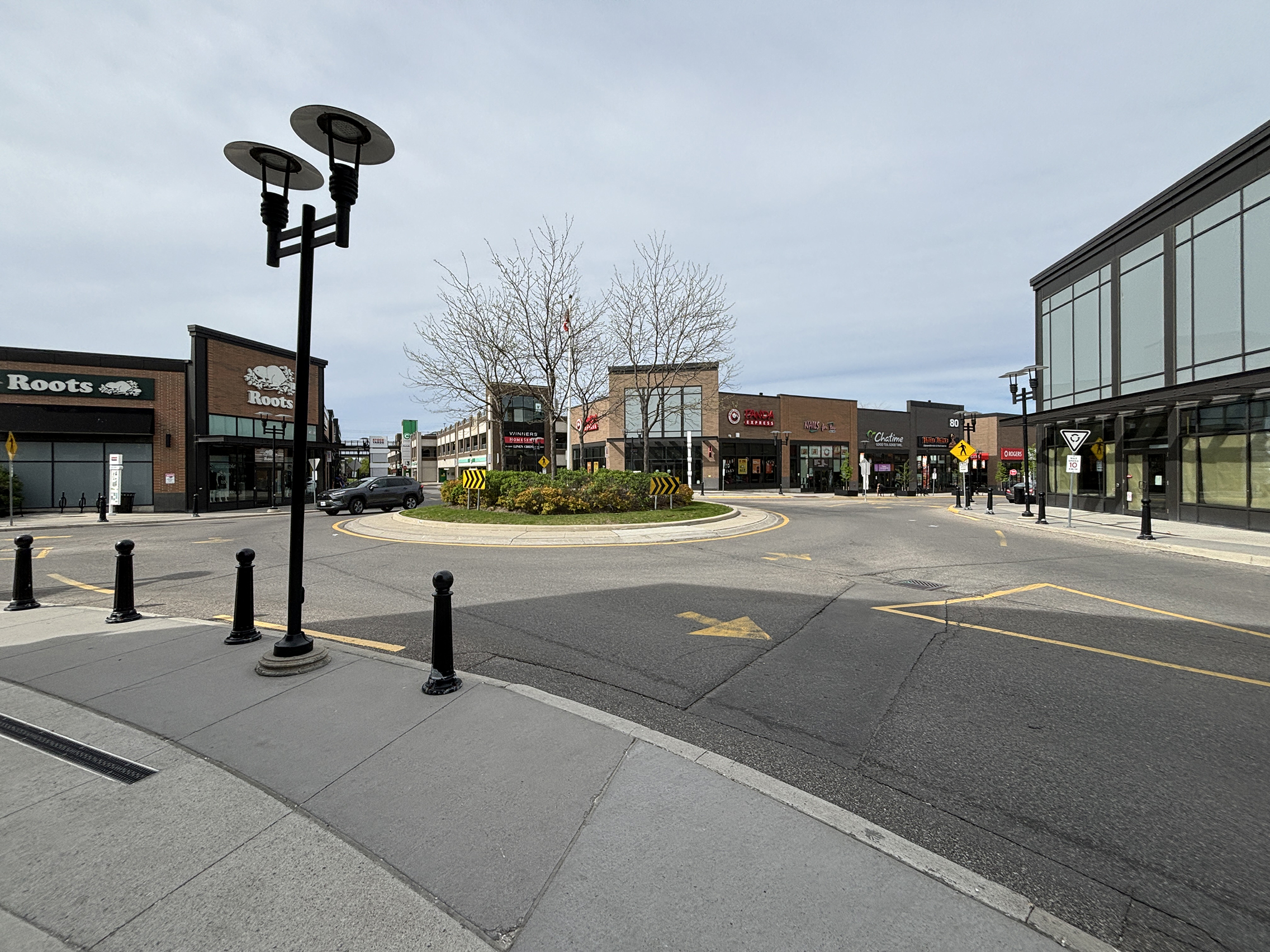
Roundabout
