= Nations Fresh Foods =

Independently-owned supermarket chain

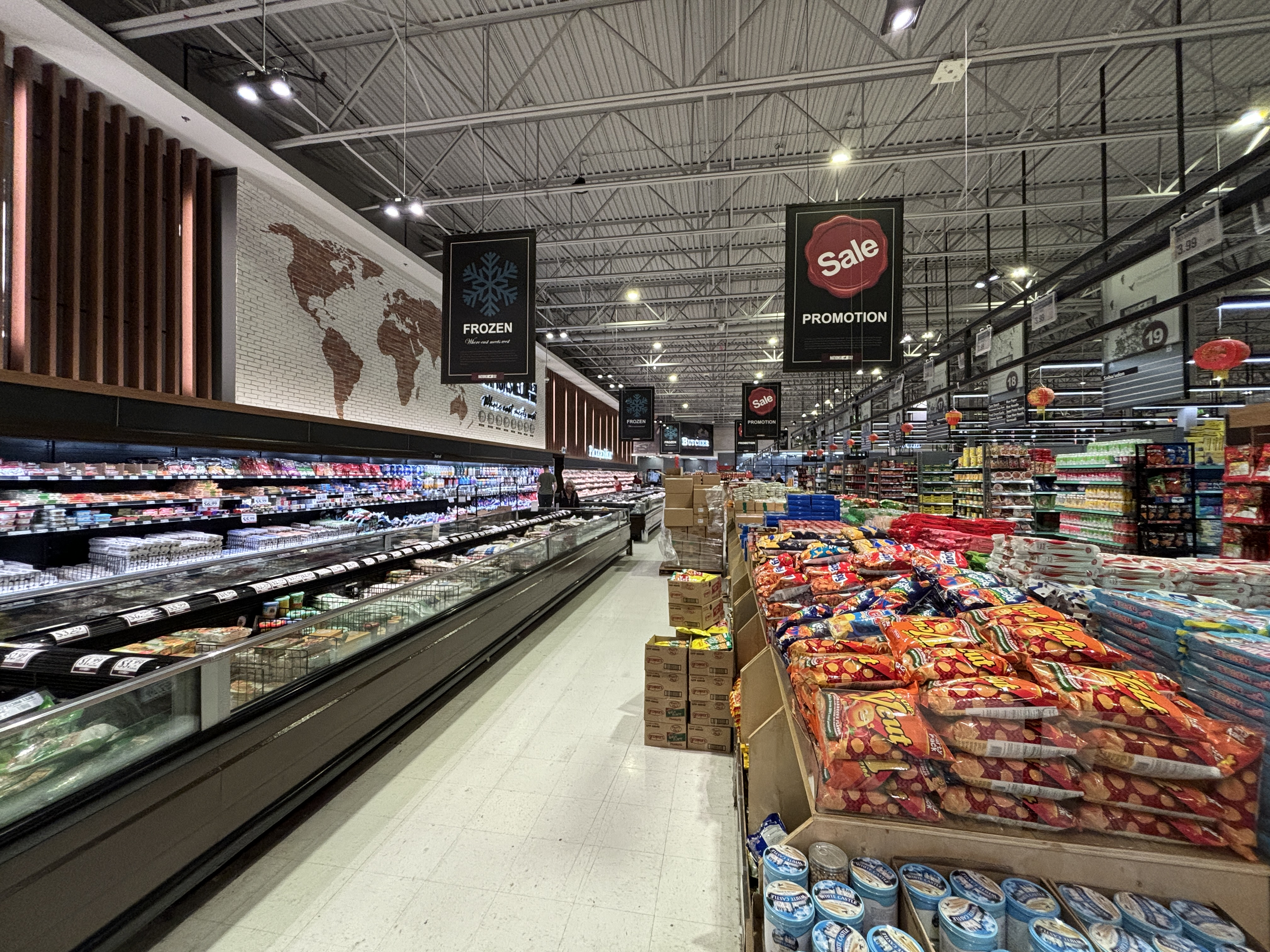
Nations Experience in Stock Yards Village, Toronto

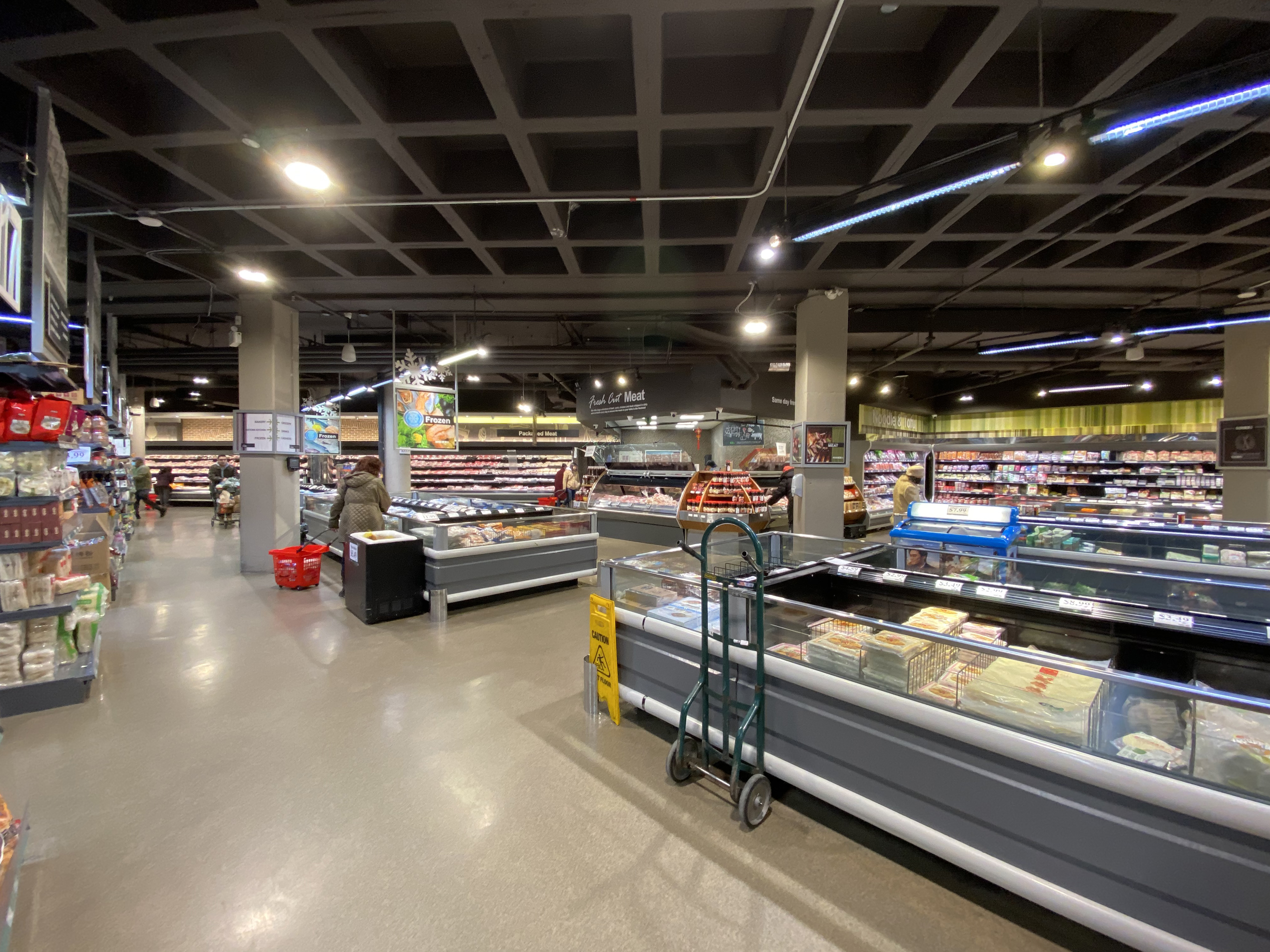
Nations Fresh Foods in Lloyd D. Jackson Square, Hamilton

Nations Fresh Foods is an independently-owned supermarket chain in Ontario, Canada. Founded in August 2012 in Woodbridge, Ontario, as a subsidiary of Oceans Fresh Group, the chain is positioned as a high-end banner focusing primarily on international groceries to appeal to Canadian multiculturalism. Some locations also offer food halls and catering services.

The chain has five stores. The first store opened in Woodbridge, Ontario on August 28, 2012, the second store opened in Hamilton at Lloyd D. Jackson Square on July 13, 2013, and the third store opened in Mississauga on February 1, 2017.

A fourth, flagship location opened at Toronto's Stock Yards Village plaza on November 16, 2017, inside a former Target Canada location. The store incorporates a concept known as Nations Experience, which includes a food hall, children's playground, arcade, and party rooms; the concept is envisioned as an entertainment venue for families.

A fifth location opened at Orion Gate Shopping Plaza in Brampton, Ontario on January 9, 2025, replacing its sister banner Oceans Fresh Food Market.

A sixth location is planned to open at Oakville Place in Oakville, Ontario in fall 2026, and will replace a former Hudson's Bay location. This store will be the 2nd Nations Experience location and will be 130,000 square feet spread across two floors. The 1st floor will include the main grocery store and food hall, while the 2nd floor will have an expanded version of the original Nations Experience concept, called Forever Young Entertainment. It will include a children's playground, arcade, party rooms, Virtual reality simulators, and a Recreation room area. Upon opening, this location will displace the Toronto store as the flagship store for the chain.
