= Oakville Place =

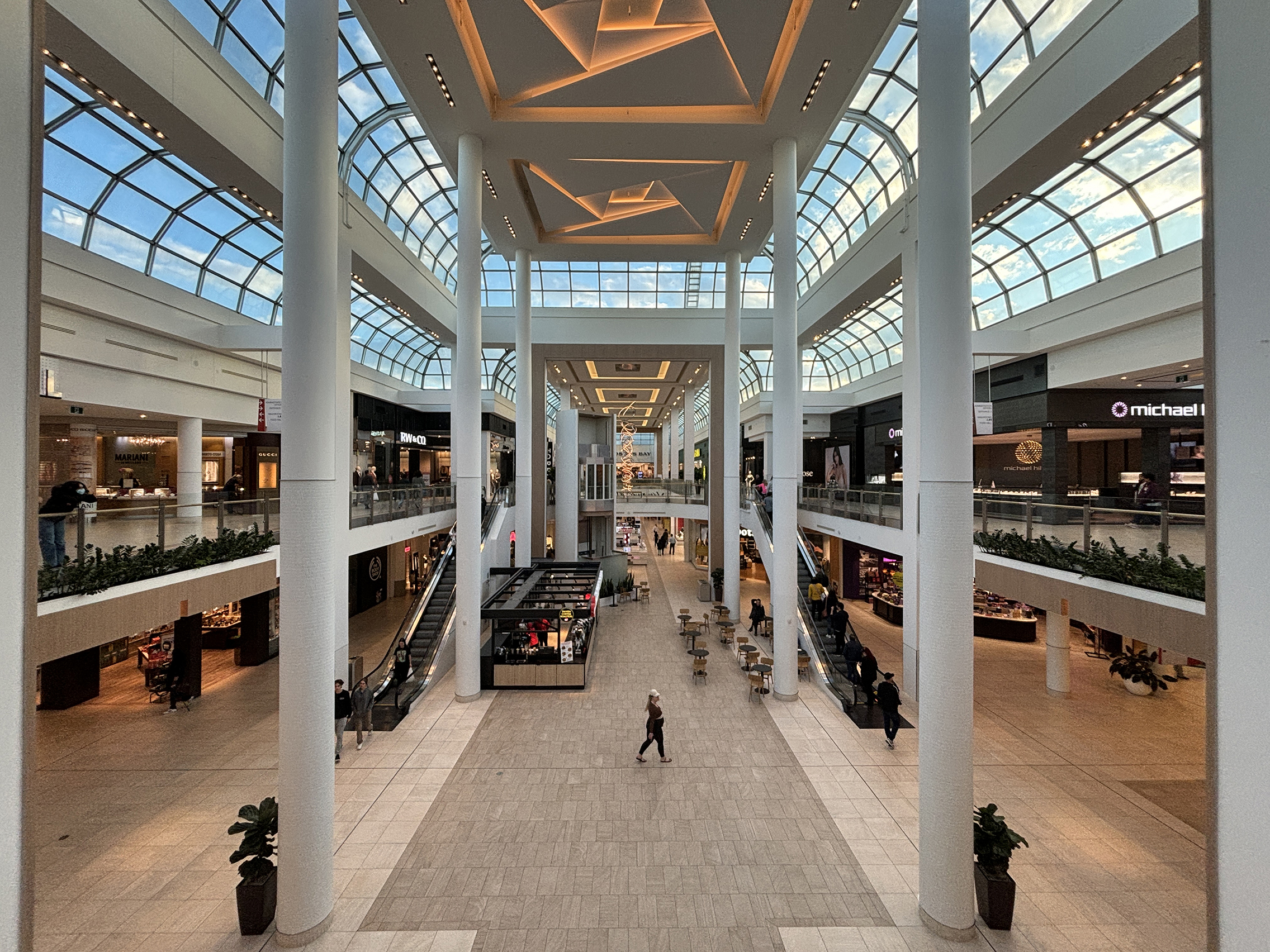
- Atrium after renovation in 2017
- Location: Oakville, Ontario, Canada
- Coordinates: 43.461523°N 79.687423°W
- Opened: 1981
- Manager: RioCan Real Estate Investment Trust
- Num. of stores: 100
- Num. of anchor tenants: 1
- Floor area: 42,000 m^{2} (452,000 sq ft)
- Floors: 2
- Website: www.oakvilleplace.com

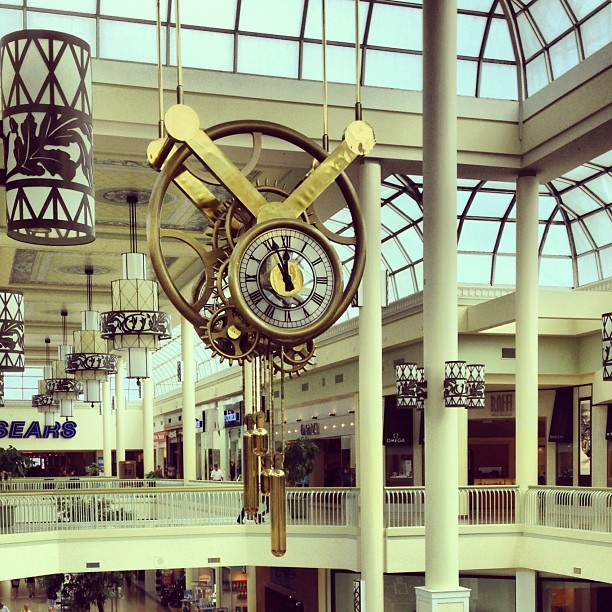
The Mosun-designed clock at the mall in 2013 and it is removed after the renovation in 2017

Oakville Place Shopping Centre is an indoor shopping mall in Oakville, Ontario, Canada. Opened in March 1981, the mall is the only major indoor mall in the Town of Oakville. The mall is approximately 42,000 square metres (452,000 sq ft). It is managed by RioCan Real Estate Investment Trust.

A centerpiece of the mall was once a monumental clock, 12 ft (3.7 m) tall and weighing 6,000 lb (2,700 kg), that chimes every quarter-hour. Designed by Chester Niziol of Omniplan Design Group and built and installed by Soheil Mosun Ltd. of Toronto, the project went into production in January 1980 and was completed in time for the mall's opening. The clock was removed in 2016 following a change in ownership. Oakville Place was described by the American Automobile Association as "Oakville's leading shopping mall".

Oakville Place was first owned and maintained by Cadillac Fairview before being bought by RioCan in the 2010s.

The mall is located at the intersection of Queen Elizabeth Way and Trafalgar Road. Oakville Transit bus route 13 (Westoak Trails) stops on the north side of the mall on Leighland Avenue and makes connections with Oakville GO Station.

== Retailers ==
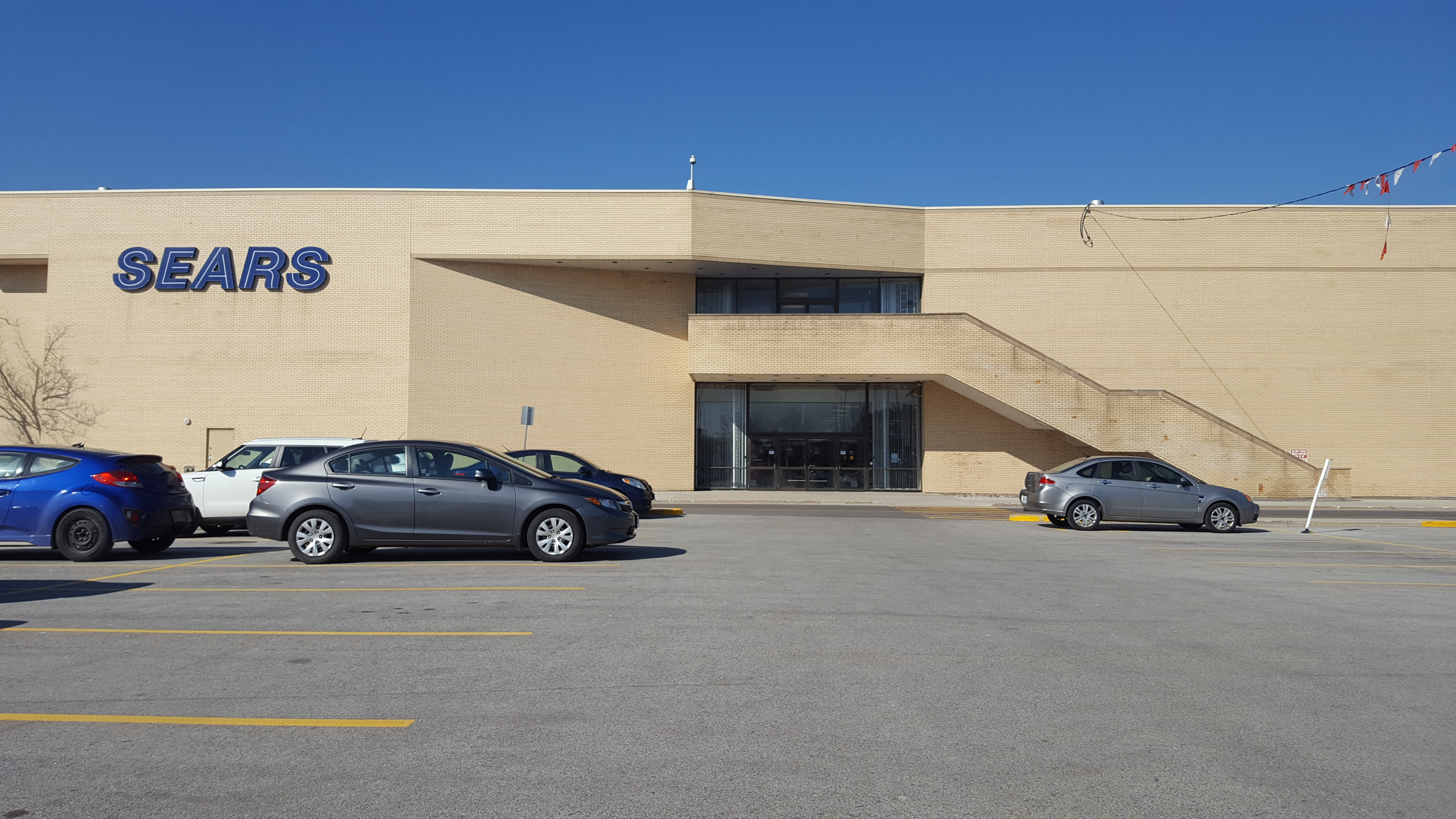
Sears' former Oakville Place location, closed ahead of Sears Canada's bankruptcy in 2017 and replaced by a PetSmart, GoodLife Fitness and Buy Buy Baby in 2019. Laura Melanie Lyne was relocated to the top floor in 2023.

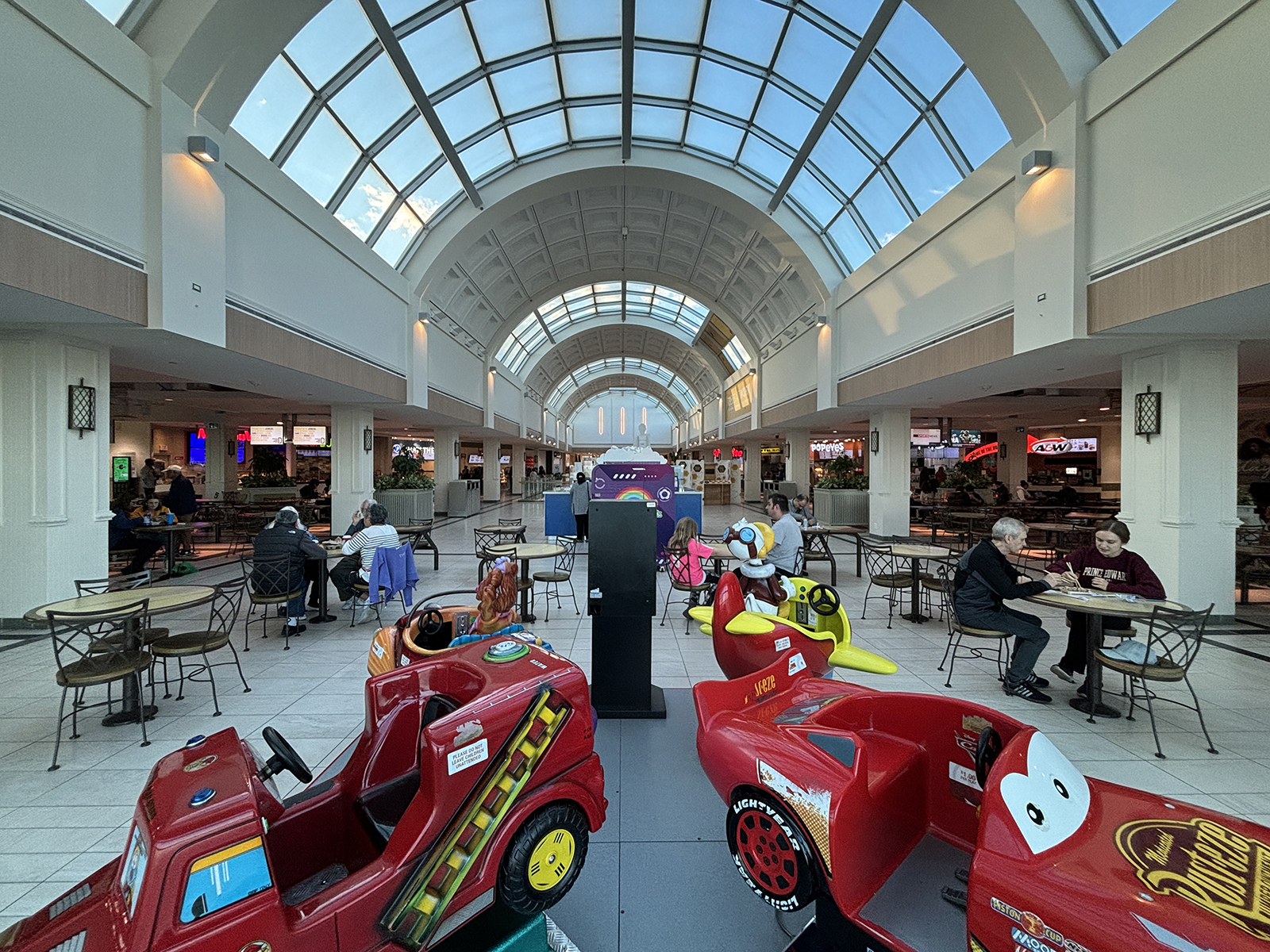
Food Court in Level 2

The mall has experienced multiple major tenant changes over its lifespan. In 2017, in the wake of Sears Canada's bankruptcy and closure, Oakville Place secured a deal with Hudson's Bay Company and Sears worth $4 million Canadian Dollars in a lease surrender for Sear's space in the mall. The concept that part of the vacant space being used for a Saks Off 5th store was floated around; however, this never came to fruition. In 2019, the empty space was filled by multiple stores instead of a single retailer. These stores were PetSmart, GoodLife Fitness, and Buy Buy Baby; they were all added where the aforementioned Sears used to be, and share the space. La Vie En Rose also opened the same year.

Oakville Place has commonly been used by new companies or concepts for first-time locations. L.L.Bean replaced Pusateri's Fine Foods in 2019, being the retailer's first Canadian location to open. The same year, a Bluenotes opened, along with the brand's first shop-in-shop Aeropostale store in November 2019; this was Aeropostale's return to Oakville Place and Canada after the company filed for bankruptcy and re-collaborated with YM, Inc. to sell its clothing in Canada alongside the Bluenotes imprint.

Multiple changes to the mall's restaurant tenants started to change or be added in 2019. Oliver and Bonacini was closed and replaced by Goodfellas Wood Oven Pizza and STACK Restaurant, which both opened in 2021. A Freshly Squeezed was unveiled in the same fall. Pearl Chinese Cuisine opened in 2022 at the front of the mall. In early 2021, H&M underwent renovations and reopened in the summer. In addition, a new Urban Kids store was opened around the same time.

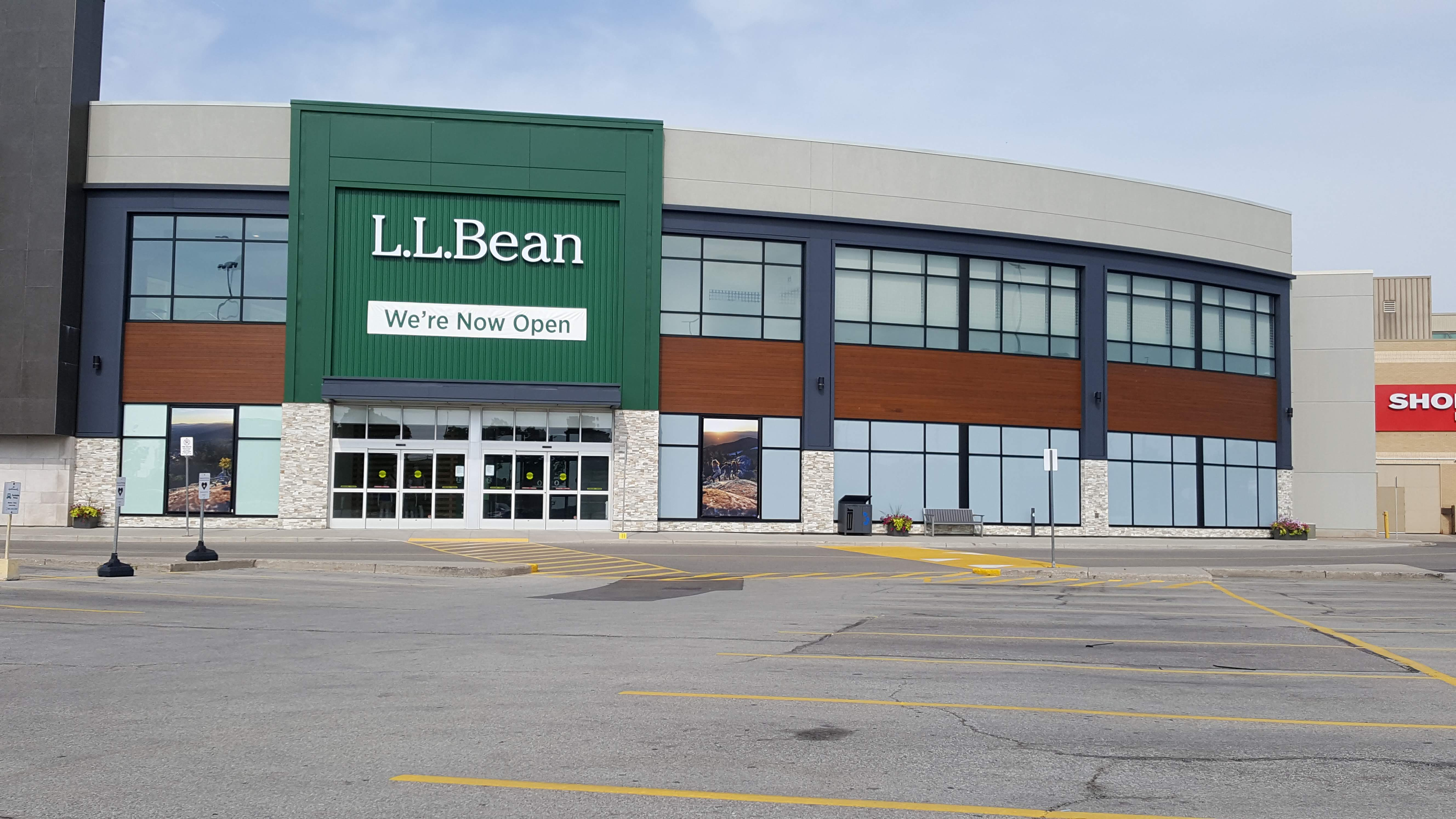
L.L.Bean's Oakville Place location, the retailer's first brick-and-mortar store in Canada.

RioCan Senior Vice President Jeff Ross has stated that these changes came from a need to turn the mall around from a "high-end retail center" that Cadillac Fairview was trying to make it, into a "strong community mall" that meets the daily needs of shoppers. The unique Sears vacancy tenant change was used as an opportunity to "change the mall from the outside to [show that] something new was going on inside the centre", citing that the new stores would result in more frequent shopping trips than a department store.

In 2023, Laura Melanie Lyne was relocated next to PetSmart, where the upper floor of Sears was once located, to accommodate for a new Dollarama store. Both GameStop and Foot Locker stores were closed in 2023 for unknown reasons. Buy Buy Baby closed on April 22, 2023, amid its parent company, Bed Bath and Beyond, completing its liquidation and bankruptcy proceedings in Canada, leaving yet another vacancy in the former Sears space which would later be filled by a Mark's.

In March 2025, Hudson's Bay filed for bankruptcy and in June 2025, closed all stores across Canada, including the location at Oakville Place. In August 2025, RioCan placed a bid to buy out the former Hudsons Bay space. In November 2025, it was announced that Nations Fresh Foods would take over the entire 130,000 square foot space and would open in 2027.
