= Longfleet =

Coordinates: 50.724°N 1.970°W

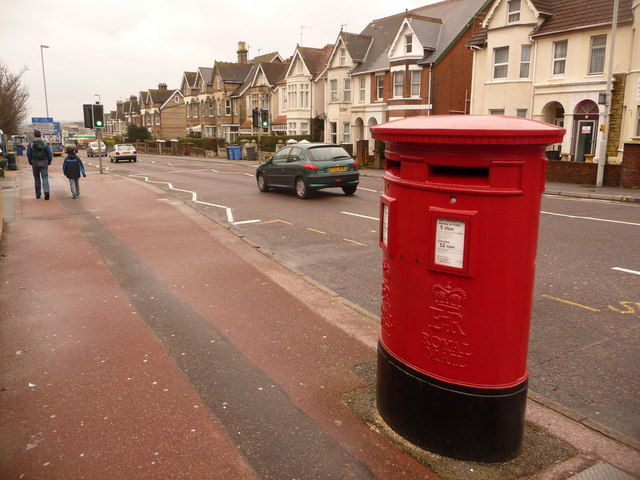
- Longfleet Road

- Location within Dorset
- Unitary authority: Bournemouth, Christchurch and Poole
- Ceremonial county: Dorset
- Region: South West
- Country: England
- Sovereign state: United Kingdom
- Post town: Poole
- Postcode district: BH15
- Dialling code: 01202
- Police: Dorset
- Fire: Dorset and Wiltshire
- Ambulance: South Western
- UK Parliament: Poole

Longfleet is a small neighbourhood of Poole, in the Bournemouth, Christchurch and Poole district of Dorset, England. It is centred on Longfleet Road, directly north of the town centre, south-east of Oakdale, and west of Parkstone. The majority land use is residential, with most housing being Victorian and Edwardian era terraces. It is also home to Poole Hospital.

== History ==
The area of Longfleet was originally part of the Manor of Canford and mentioned in the Pipe Rolls of 1230. It became a parish of its own right in 1833. Longfleet is also the site of the Tatnam Well which used to provide water for the town of Poole.

In the early 1870s, Longfleet was "a tything and a chapelry in Canford Magna parish [about] 1 mile NNE of Poole town and r. station; and includes part of the town and of the harbour..." It covered an area of 1,458 acres, 285 of which were water. Poole Workhouse was located in the tything, housing 102 inmates in 1861. There was also a manor owned by Sir J. B. Guest, Bart. There is a national school.

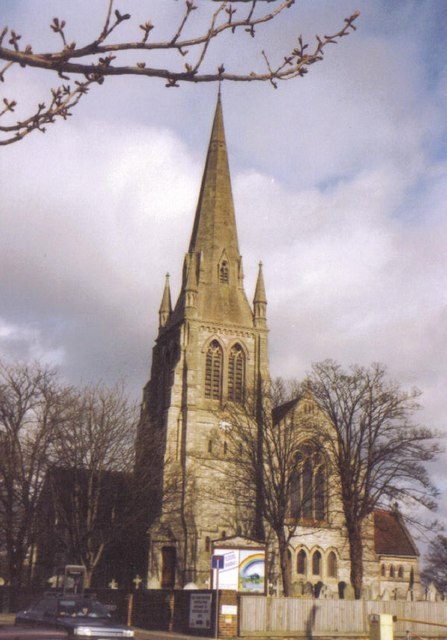
St. Mary's Church

Originally consecrated in 1833, the Church of Longfleet St Mary (CofE) was built chiefly at the expense of Lord de Mauley and designed by Edward Blore. In the 1870s, the chapelry, which was more extensive than the tything, had a population of 1,598 and 317 houses. The living was (and still is) a vicarage in the diocese of Salisbury. Its patron then was Sir J. B. Guest. The prominent spire was added in 1884 and additional building work carried out in 1915. In 1995 the church was designated as a grade II listed building.

In 1866 Longfleet became a separate civil parish, on 9 November 1905 the parish was abolished to form Poole. It is now in the unparished area of Poole.

== Population ==
In 1851, Longfleet had a population of 1,287. In 1861, it had grown to 1,417 and there were 288 houses. In 1901 the parish had a population of 4159.

== Community facilities ==
The NHS hospital Poole General occupies a large site in Longfleet, with its main campus on the east side of Longfleet Road and the maternity unit on St Mary's Road. The site of the maternity unit and the adjacent private hospital was once the site of a workhouse built in 1839. It was used eventually as a wing of the maternity hospital, but was demolished in 1979. There are also two local doctor surgeries: Longfleet House surgery, and The Adam Practice which sits on part of the site of the original Longfleet School.

The neighbourhood is dominated by the spire of St. Mary's Church which stands near the brow of the hill. It can be seen from some miles around and is described by English Heritage as one of the "landmarks of Poole". In 2014, a new church centre was opened opposite the main church in Kingston Road. The church has a congregation of around 700, which makes it the largest in the Diocese of Salisbury.

The local school is Longfleet Church of England VC Primary School, which moved from Longfleet Road to a new purpose-built building off Joliffe Road at Joliffe Avenue in 1996.

Longfleet Road also features a green area beneath which were World War II air-raid shelters for the area.

== Sport ==
The area has a football club, Longfleet FC, who are a large community based outfit who cater for all standards. They run numerous youth sides, two men's teams and a successful ladies section. There was previously a club called Longfleet St Mary's who enjoyed a long distinguished history.
