= Bournemouth Gasworks Athletic F.C. =

- Full name: Bournemouth Gasworks Athletic Football Club
- Nicknames: Gasmen, The Lights
- Founded: 1899
- Dissolved: 1972
- Ground: Alder Road, Branksome, Poole
Home colours	Away colours

Bournemouth Gasworks Athletic F.C. was an English amateur football club from Poole, Dorset, who were successful in both county and national competitions until they became defunct in 1972.

== History ==
Gasworks Athletic were founded in 1899 as the Bournemouth Gas & Water Co works side and joined the Hampshire League West Division in 1904, playing at East Lake in Parkstone. After World War I, they became Bournemouth Gasworks Athletic and in 1921 were placed in the County Division (later to become Division 1). This marked the start of a very successful period for 'the Lights' as they were crowned champions in 1923 and frequently won the Dorset Senior Cup.

The club gained national recognition for their exploits in the FA Amateur Cup, travelling the country and enjoying several lengthy runs in the competition. The most famous of these came in 1930 when they incredibly progressed through nine rounds (defeating Wycombe Wanderers, Barnet and Wimbledon) to reach the final at West Ham United's Upton Park. Here, in front of a crowd of 21,800, they held favourites Ilford 1–1 at the break before eventually losing 1-5. Three years later, they reached the semi-finals but were narrowly beaten 1–2 by Stockton.

In 1932 the Gasworks opened their new stadium at Alder Road and by this point were very much the dominant force in county football. They were Hampshire league champions a further four times during the thirties with the reserve side also winning the Division 2 title.

The post World War II era saw Bournemouth Gasworks remain a prominent force; three times they reached the FA Cup third qualifying round and twice won the Hampshire Senior Cup. However, in 1957 the club were surprisingly relegated after finishing bottom, and after a mid-table finish in Division 2, they left to play in local Dorset football, where they would go on to enjoy further successes.

Through circumstances beyond their control, the loss of their home ground in 1966 inevitably saw a decline in fortunes. Now playing at Branksome Rec, they struggled on until folding in 1972.

The final curtain came down in March 1973. The club staged a formal farewell dinner to commemorate the end of an illustrious history. The event was well attended with a number of legends from the 1930 FA Amateur Cup final team in attendance.

== Honours ==
- Football Association
  - Amateur Cup Finalists 1929–30
- Hampshire Football Association
  - Senior Cup Winners (2) 1952–53 and 1953–54
- Hampshire League
  - Division 1 Champions (5) 1922-23, 1931–32, 1934–35, 1935–36 and 1937–38, Runners-up 1936–37
  - Division 2 Champions (1) 1935-36, Runners-up 1934-35 (Reserves)
- Dorset Football Association
  - Senior Cup Winners (10) 1908–09, 1909–10, 1910–11, 1911–12, 1913–14, 1920–21, 1921–22, 1924–25, 1930–31 and 1938–39
  - Amateur Cup winners (9)
  - Senior League Champions (9)

== Playing records ==
=== Hampshire League ===
Season	Division	Position	Significant events
1904/05	West Division	5/9	
1905/06	West Division	7/7	
1906/07	West Division	2/7	Runners-up
1907/08	West Division	7/8	
1908/09	West Division	3/7	
1909/10	West Division	2/7	Runners-up
1910/11	West Division	2/7	Runners-up
1911/12	West Division	3/8	
1912/13	West Division	2/8	Runners-up
1913/14	West Division	2/9	Runners-up
1914–19			
1919/20	West Division	6/8	
1920/21	West Division	4/10	Promoted
1921/22	County Division	7/16	
1922/23	County Division	1/17	Champions, promoted
1923/24	County Division	7/16	
1924/25	County Division	8/16	
1925/26	County Division	7/16	
1926/27	County Division	6/16	
1927/28	County Division	4/16	Re-organisation
1928/29	South Division	4/13	Re-organisation
1929/30	Division 1	5/16	
1930/31	Division 1	5/16	
1931/32	Division 1	1/16	Champions
1932/33	Division 1	3/15	
1933/34	Division 1	3/16	
1934/35	Division 1	1/16	Champions (Reserves runners-up in Division 2)
1935/36	Division 1	1/16	Champions (Reserves champions of Division 2)
1936/37	Division 1	2/16	Runners-up
1937/38	Division 1	1/16	Champions
1938/39	Division 1	3/16	
1939–45			
1945/46	Division 1	7/16	
1946/47	Division 1	5/14	(Reserves champions of Division 3)
1947/48	Division 1	6/14	
1948/49	Division 1	2/14	Runners-up
1949/50	Division 1	6/14	
1950/51	Division 1	7/14	
1951/52	Division 1	7/14	
1952/53	Division 1	3/14	
1953/54	Division 1	3/14	
1954/55	Division 1	12/14	
1955/56	Division 1	12/14	
1956/57	Division 1	14/14	Relegated
1957/58	Division 2	6/16	Left competition

=== FA Cup ===
Season	Round	Opponents	Result
1905/06	1st Qualifying Round	A v Weymouth	L 3-5
1906/07	1st Qualifying Round	A v Yeovil Casuals	W 1-0
	2nd Qualifying Round	A v 2nd Royal Warwicks	W 2-1
	3rd Qualifying Round	H v Poole Town	L 2-3
1907/08	1st Qualifying Round	H v Yeovil Town	W 1-0
	2nd Qualifying Round	H v Whiteheads	L 1-2
1908/09	1st Qualifying Round	A v Whiteheads	L 4-6
1909/10	1st Qualifying Round	H v Boscombe	D 0-0
	Replay	A v Boscombe	L 1-2
1910/11	1st Qualifying Round	H v Longfleet St Marys	W 4-3
	2nd Qualifying Round	A v Torquay Town	D 1-1
	Replay	H v Torquay Town	L 0-1
1911/12	1st Qualifying Round	A v Street	D 0-0
	Replay	H v Street	L 0-1
1912/13	Preliminary Round	H v Woolston	L 0-4
1913/14	Preliminary Round	A v Gosport United	L 1-3
1919/20	Preliminary Round	H v Thornycrofts (Woolston)	L 0-5
1921/22	Extra-Preliminary Round	A v Osborne Athletic	W 3-1
	Preliminary Round	H v Harland & Wolff	L 0-2
1922/23	Extra-Preliminary Round	A v Bournemouth	W 3-0
	Preliminary Round	H v Salisbury Corinthians	W 3-0
	1st Qualifying Round	A v Portsea Island Gas Co	L 2-3
1923/24	Extra-Preliminary Round	H v East Cowes Victoria	W 6-0
	Preliminary Round	H v Sholing Athletic	W 3-2
	1st Qualifying Round	A v Gosport Athletic	L 0-2
1924/25	Extra-Preliminary Round	A v Bournemouth	L 2-3
1925/26	Extra-Preliminary Round	H v Harland & Wolff	W 6-1
	Preliminary Round	H v Bournemouth Tramways	L 1-2
1946/47	1st Qualifying Round	A v Newport	W 1-0
	2nd Qualifying Round	A v RAOC Hilsea	D 2-2
	Replay	H v RAOC Hilsea	W 6-2
	3rd Qualifying Round	A v Poole Town	L 2-3
1947/48	Preliminary Round	H v Portland United	W 4-0
	1st Qualifying Round	H v Gosport Borough	L 0-3
1948/49	Preliminary Round	A v Gosport Borough	W 1-0
	1st Qualifying Round	A v East Cowes Victoria	L 1-3
1949/50	Extra-Preliminary Round	A Bournemouth	L 0-1
1950/51	Extra-Preliminary Round	H v Shaftesbury	L 1-2
1951/52	1st Qualifying Round	A v Bridport	D 2-2
	Replay	H v Bridport	L 1-3
	2nd Qualifying Round	H v Portland United	L 1-3
1952/53	1st Quantifying Round	H v Poole Town	W 3-1
	2nd Qualifying Round	H v Portland United	W 5-1
	3rd Qualifying Round	A v Dorchester Town	L 1-2
1953/54	1st Quantifying Round	H v Bridport	W 8-0
	2nd Qualifying Round	A v Ilminster Town	W 4-0
	3rd Qualifying Round	A v Portland United	L 1-4
1954/55	2nd Quantifying Round	A v Dorchester Town	L 0-4
1955/56	1st Qualifying Round	A v Cowes	L 1-4
1956/57	2nd Qualifying Round	A v Andover	L 2-3

=== FA Amateur Cup ===
Season	Round	Opponents	Result
1905/06	1st Qualifying Round	H v Longfleet St Marys	L 0-4
1906/07	1st Qualifying Round	A v Longfleet St Marys	D 1-1
	Replay	H v Longfleet St Marys	D 1-1
	2nd Replay	N v Longfleet St Marys	L 1-2
1907/08	1st Qualifying Round	A v Boscombe	D 2-2
	Replay	H v Boscombe	L 0-2
1908/09	1st Qualifying Round	A v Poole Town	L 1-6
1909/10	1st Qualifying Round	H v RGS Weymouth	L 1-2
1910/11	2nd Qualifying Round	H v Bournemouth	W 2-0
	3rd Qualifying Round	H v Boscombe	W 2-1
	4th Qualifying Round	H v Bournemouth Wanderers	W 9-2
	Round 1	A v Old Kingstonians	D 1-1
	Replay	H v Old Kingstonians	W 3-2
	Round 2	H v Loughborough Corinthians	W 3-0
	Round 3	H v Ilford	L 0-2
1911/12	4th Qualifying Round	H v 2nd Wiltshire Regiment	W 4-3
	Round 1	A v Cardiff Corinthians	D 1-1
	Round 2	H v Redhill	W 1-0
	Round 3	H v Dulwich Hamlet	L 0-1
1912/13	Round 1	A v 1st Kings Royal Rifles	L 0-3
1913/14	Round 1	A v Royal Engineers (Aldershot)	D 1-1
	Replay	H v Royal Engineers (Aldershot)	W 2-1
	Round 2	H v Oxford City	L 0-1
1919/20	Round 1	H v Worthing	W 2-1
	Round 2	H v Clandown	W 5-0
	Round 3	H v Oxford City	L 0-1
1920/21	Round 1	A v RAMC Aldershot	L 0-2
1921/22	Round 1	H v Royal Corps of Signals	W 2-1
	Round 2	A v Metrogas	L 0-2
1922/23	Round 1	H v Hastings & St Leonards	W 1-0
	Round 2	H v Clapton	L 0-1
1923/24	Round 1	A v Bristol St Georges Sports	L 0-1
1924/25	2nd Qualifying Round	A v Castle Hill	W 3-2
	3rd Qualifying Round	A v Blandford United	D 1-1
	Replay	A v Blandford United	W 2-1
	4th Qualifying Round	H v Bournemouth Tramways	W 3-0
	Round 1	H v Hastings & St Leonards	D 1-1
	Replay	A v Hastings & St Leonards	L 0-4
1925/26	2nd Qualifying Round	A v Bournemouth Tramways	L 0-2
1926/27	2nd Qualifying Round	A v Blandford United	L 1-2
1927/28	2nd Qualifying Round	A v Blandford United	W 7-0
	3rd Qualifying Round	A v Bournemouth Tramways	D 1-1
	Replay	A v Bournemouth Tramways	W 3-2
	4th Qualifying Round	A v 5th Royal Tank Corps	L 1-2
1928/29	2nd Qualifying Round	H v Salisbury Corinthians	W 9-2
	3rd Qualifying Round	A v 5th Royal Tank Corps	W 6-3
	4th Qualifying Round	H v Bournemouth	W 2-1
	Round 1	H v Tuffnell Park	W 3-0
	Round 2	A v Wycombe Wanderers	L 2-5
1929/30	1st Qualifying Round	H v Blandford United	W 6-0
	2nd Qualifying Round	H v Royal Engineers (Southampton)	W 2-0
	3rd Qualifying Round	H v Royal Marines Portsmouth	W 3-2
	4th Qualifying Round	H v Fareham	W 2-0
	Round 1	H v Wycombe Wanderers	W 2-1
	Round 2	H v Welton Rovers	W 4-0
	Round 3	H v Barnet	W 3-1
	Round 4	H v Percy Main Amateurs	W 2-0
	Semi-Final	N v Wimbledon	W 2-0
	Final	N v Ilford	L 1-5
1930/31	Round 1	A v Barnet	L 3-9
1931/32	1st Qualifying Round	H v RAOC Hilsea	W 2-1
	2nd Qualifying Round	H v Royal Marines Portsmouth	W 4-0
	3rd Qualifying Round	H v Fareham	W 6-1
	4th Qualifying Round	H v Ryde Sports	W 3-1
	Round 1	A v Chesham United	W 4-1
	Round 2	H v Hayes	W 2-1
	Round 3	A v Leyton	L 0-3
1932/33	Round 1	A v Stowmarket Town	W 4-2
	Round 2	A v Weston-Super-Mare	D 1-1
	Replay	H v Weston-Super-Mare	W 1-0
	Round 3	A v Guiseley	W 2-1
	Round 4	A v Erith & Belvedere	W 2-0
	Semi-Final	N v Stockton	L 1-2
1933/34	Round 1	A v Weston-Super-Mare	D 0-0
	Replay	H v Weston-Super-Mare	W 4-0
	Round 2	A v Portland United	W 5-0
	Round 3	H v Casuals	L 1-5
1934/35	Round 1	H v Banbury Spencer	W 2-1
	Round 2	A v Kingstonian	L 1-4
1935/36	Round 1	A v Gosport	L 1-2
1936/37	Round 1	A v Hastings & St Leonards	W 4-0
	Round 2	A v Metropolitan Police	W 2-1
	Round 3	A v Bromley	L 0-4
1937/38	Round 1	H v Leytonstone	L 0-1
1938/39	Round 1	A v Wimbledon	D 3-3
	Replay	H v Wimbledon	L 0-1
1945/46	Round 1	H v Totton	L 2-5
1946/47	Round 1	A v Peasedown Miners Welfare	L 1-2
1947/48	4th Qualifying Round	A v Totton	L 2-3
1948/49	Preliminary Round	A v Dorchester Town	L 2-3
1949/50	Round 1	A v Redhill	W 1-0
	Round 2	H v Cambridge Town	L 0-2
1950/51	4th Qualifying Round	H v Salisbury	L 0-3
1951/52	3rd Qualifying Round	H v Fareham Town	D 0-0
	Replay	A v Fareham Town	W 2-1
	4th Qualifying Round	H v Salisbury	L 1-6
1952/53	Extra-Preliminary Round	A v Bournemouth	L 2-3
1953/54	4th Qualifying Round	A v East Cowes Victoria	W 6-1
	Round 1	A v Briggs Sports	L 1-3
1954/55	4th Qualifying Round	H v Alton Town	D 2-2
	Replay	A v Alton Town	L 2-5
1955/56	Preliminary Round	A v Swanage Town	W 4-1
	1st Qualifying Round	H v Hamworthy	L 2-4
1956/57	Preliminary Round	A v Blandford United	L 1-2
1957/58	Preliminary Round	A v Bournemouth	W 3-0
	1st Qualifying Round	H v Thornycroft Athletic	W 2-1
	2nd Qualifying Round	H v Pirelli General	D 3-3
	Replay	A v Pirelli General	L 3-6
1958/59	Preliminary Round	H v Hamworthy	L 2-5

== Ground ==
Bournemouth Gasworks played at Alder Road - directly opposite Branksome Recreation Ground in Poole. Opened in 1932, the venue was enclosed, with a large stand and is now covered by housing. The record attendance was in October 1946 when over 1,000 watched the narrow 2-3 defeat by neighbours Poole Town in the FA Cup 3rd qualifying round.

== Notable players ==
The club had many fine players during their existence, including Dennis Bushby, Peter Gledstone and Derek Reeves who all started at the Gasworks before enjoying successful professional careers with Bournemouth & Boscombe Athletic and Southampton.

== Local rivals ==
There are many clubs within the area that Gasworks enjoyed a healthy rivalry with over the years.

Initially, in the Hampshire League these included Boscombe, Bournemouth "Poppies" and, until their demise, Bournemouth Tramways.

After moving to Dorset football, the main local rivals were then regarded as Poole Town, Hamworthy and Longfleet St Marys.
