= PetSmart Charities =

Non-profit organization

- Formation: 1994; 32 years ago
- Tax ID no.: 93-1140967
- Legal status: Foundation
- Purpose: Animal welfare
- Location: Phoenix
- Region served: North America
- President: Aimee Gilbreath
- Revenue: $68.7 million (2025)
- Website: petsmartcharities.org

PetSmart Charities and PetSmart Charities of Canada are non-profit organizations dedicated to pet adoption and welfare, with focuses on pet hunger, disaster relief, and access to care. In the United States, PetSmart Charities is the largest financial supporter of animal welfare and among the 400 largest philanthropic organizations working on any issue. Their primary goal is to save the lives of homeless pets through programs such as their In-Store Adoption Centers in many PetSmart locations, grant program for animal welfare agencies across North America, and community adoption events. Support for increasing access to affordable veterinary care is a key priority for the organization.

== History ==
PetSmart Charities was formed in 1994 by PetSmart founders Jim and Janice Dougherty, who made a decision to avoid selling dogs and cats within their stores in favor of showcasing pet adoption programs.

In 2004, PetSmart charities launched The Rescue Waggin’ program, which helped relocate pets from facilities in overpopulated communities to adoption centers in areas where there is more demand and higher chance of adoption. The program was sunset in 2016.

=== Major grants ===
The charity has made major donations to further animal welfare. In 2007, it gave a $420,750 to the University of California-Davis. According to the organization, the fund will be used to finance an urgent need for an academic position dedicated to extending medical knowledge to shelter professionals. In 2006, PetSmart Charities awarded $2.3 million in grants to help disaster relief agencies and animal welfare organizations address the needs of pets abandoned, hurt or lost during hurricanes and other natural disasters. In 2006, it offered a request for proposals for $20,000 matching grants toward the establishment of state animal response teams in the U.S. The SART model is a public-private partnership for preparation and response to animal emergencies.

PetSmart Charities gave the largest gift in its history in May 2023, a $6 million grant to name an endowed chair at the UC Davis School of Veterinary Medicine. The grant is part of a $100 million commitment to improve access to veterinary care.

== Funding ==
According to PetSmart Charities, 80 percent of its cash donations occur at customer checkout, a program the retailer has been running since approximately 2004. The average donation is just under $3.

== Animal welfare and adoption support ==
PetSmart Charities fund spay and neuter programs to reduce the number of feral or unwanted animals. As of November 2024, the organization has also provided for the adoption of more than 11 million pets.

Most PetSmart locations have an adoption center to house animals from local animal welfare organizations. PetSmart donates space for each center in their stores, PetSmart Charities funds the cost to build the center, and local animal welfare organizations are invited to bring their animals into the centers. While most stores are equipped with an Everyday Adoption Center that can house cats 24 hours a day, some stores have Enhanced Adoption Centers which lend the ability to also house dogs and include a playroom to meet the animals. The animal welfare organizations are still responsible for the care of the pets, even when placed in an adoption center.

PetSmart Charities also has a program where they will partner with other local animal welfare agencies in order to further the pet adoption process.

PetSmart stores host adoption events by partnering with local animal rescue and welfare organizations. In addition, PetSmart Charities sponsors four national adoption events each year showcasing animals from multiple adoption groups in each store. On average, more than 17,000 pets find a new home during each national adoption event.

PetSmart Charities works with Feeding America and Meals on Wheels to support the distribution of pet food through local channels. In 2023, the organization created Pet Hunger Awareness Day to occur on the last Tuesday of September. PetSmart Charities of Canada provided a grant to Humane Canada to fund a similar initiative and created a map of more than 300 pet food assistance programs in Canada.

The Emergency Relief Waggin' program was formed to quickly deliver emergency supplies to areas that have gone through a type of major disaster or emergency. The trucks are strategically placed at PetSmart owned distribution centers around the country to ensure quick response and deployment.

PetSmart Charities works with the American Red Cross to provide resources and funding to people with pets preparing for or recovering from a disaster. The organization also provides grants to create low-cost and nonprofit veterinary clinics and expand low-cost offerings from existing veterinary providers.
