= Soheil Mosun =

Soheil Mosun Limited
- Company type: Private
- Industry: Architectural fabrication Construction
- Founded: 1973 in Etobicoke, Ontario, Canada
- Founder: Soheil Mosun and Brigitta Mosun
- Headquarters: Toronto, Ontario, Canada
- Key people: Darius F. Mosun (Chairman and CEO); Cyrus B. Mosun (President and Vice Chair)
- Website: www.mosun.com

Soheil Mosun Limited (SML) is a custom architectural manufacturer and design-build company headquartered in Toronto, Ontario, Canada. Founded in 1973 by Soheil and Brigitta Mosun, SML was established as a privately owned corporation. SML started as an architectural model-building firm and has since progressed to a complete design-build company capable of servicing any fabrication or architectural manufacturing project.

== History ==
The company was founded by husband & wife, Soheil and Brigitta Mosun in 1973.

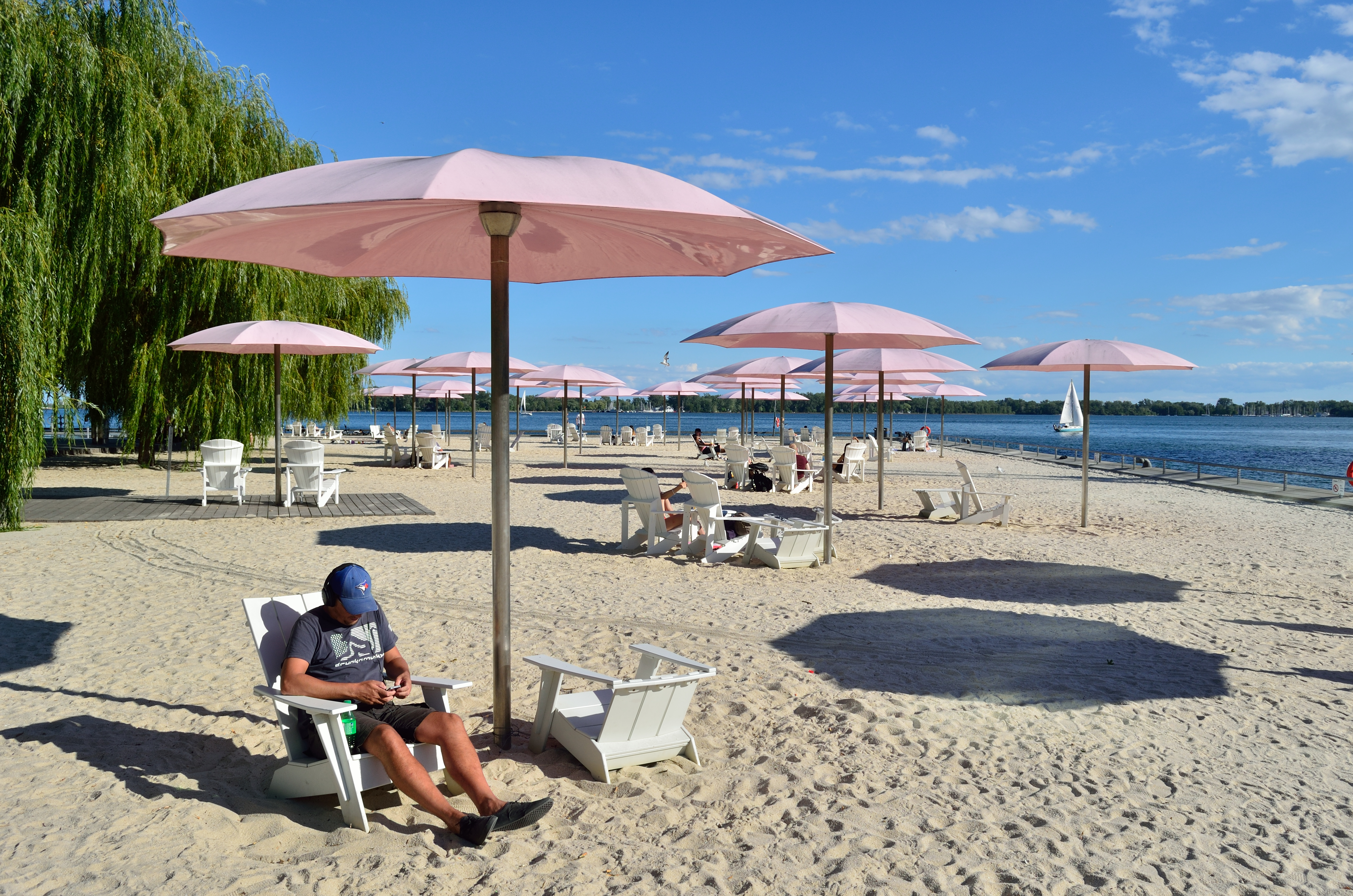
The pink umbrellas, supplied by Soheil Mosun Ltd., were criticised for contributing to the high cost of revitalizing Sugar Beach

== Notable projects ==
- The brass clock in Oakville Place.
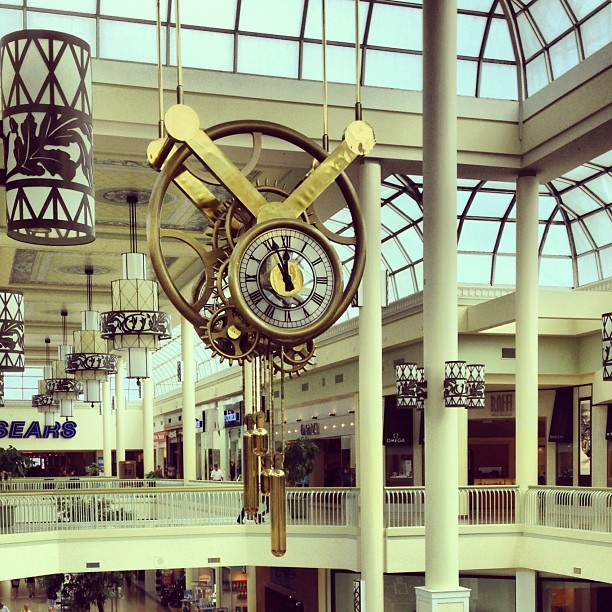
  The brass clocks at Oakville Place. This display was created and manufactured by Soheil Mosun Ltd.
- Library of Parliament in Ottawa, Ontario, Canada – bronze windows fabrication and restoration.
- Elevator cab interior design and fabrication in 1st Canadian Place, Scotia Plaza, BCE Place and the CN Tower
- The construction of the Baha’i Temple in Santiago, Chile.
- The construction of the International Jewish War Veterans Memorial in Toronto, Ontario, Canada
- Repairs to "Wheel of Conscience" at the Canadian Museum of Immigration at Pier 21

== Other projects ==
SML is involved in the manufacturing of many awards for various prestigious institutions such as:

- The Genie Award
- The Gemini Award
- The Scotiabank Giller Prize
- The Advertising Design Industry of Canada award
- The Canadian Country Music Award
- The Canadian Walk of Fame Stars
