= PetSmart =

American pet supply store chain

PetSmart Inc

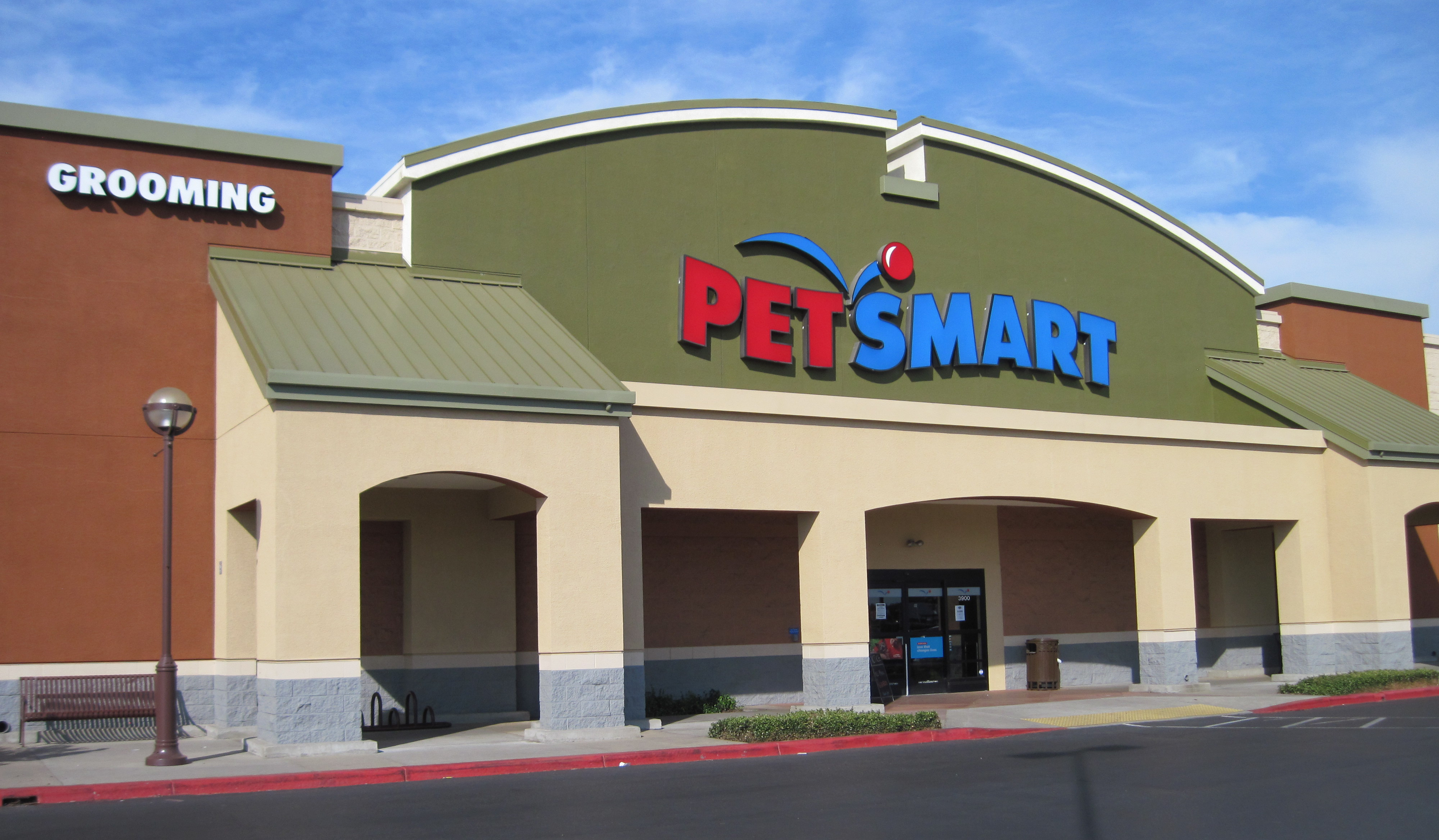
- PetSmart location in Modesto, California
- Formerly: PetFood Warehouse, PETsMART
- Type: Private
- Industry: Retail
- Founded: August 14, 1986; 40 years ago in Phoenix, Arizona
- Founder: Jim Dougherty
- Headquarters: Phoenix, Arizona, United States
- Number of locations: 1,600+ (2020)
- Area served: United States; Canada
- Key people: Ken C. Hicks (CEO)
- Products: Pet food, pet supplies
- Services: Grooming, training, PetsHotel, Doggie Day Camp
- Revenue: ▲$7 billion (2020)
- Owner: BC Partners; Apollo Global Management
- Number of employees: 56,000 (2020)
- Divisions: PetSmart Charities
- Website: www.petsmart.com

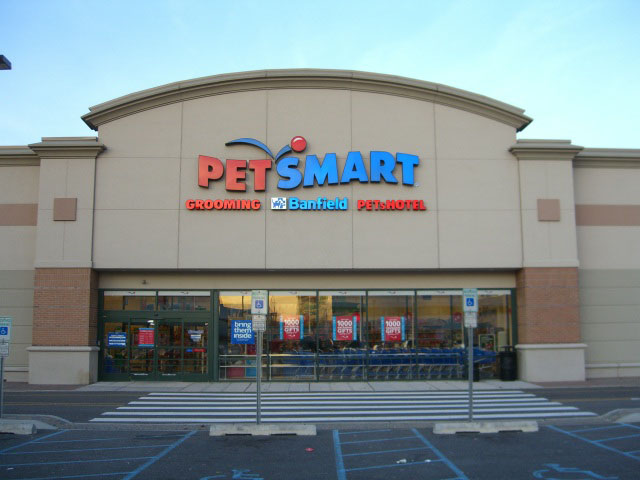
PetSmart in Secaucus, New Jersey

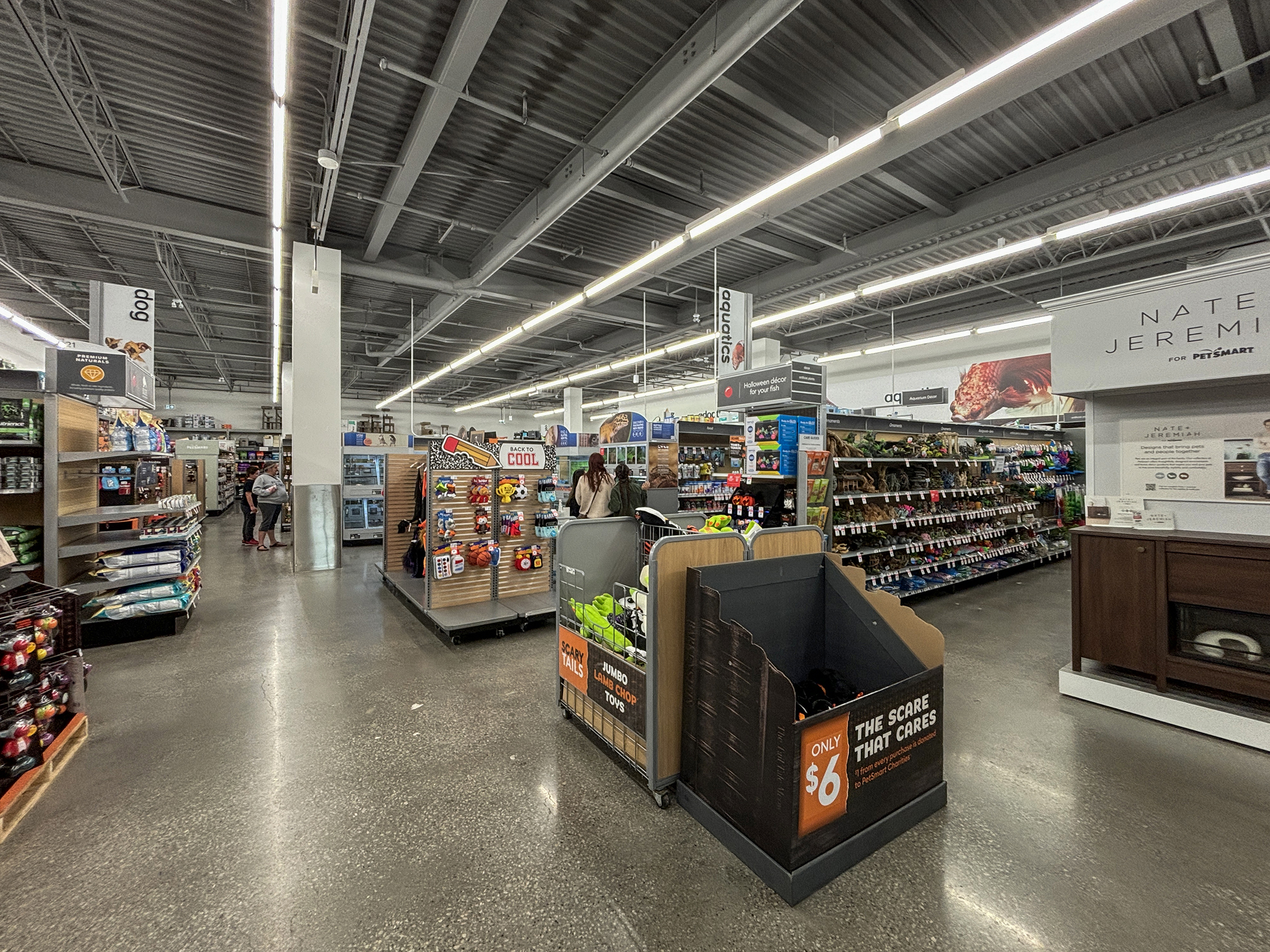
PetSmart store in Oakville Place, Ontario

PetSmart is an American chain of pet superstores, which sell pet products, services, and small pets. As of 2020, PetSmart has more than 1,650 stores in the United States and Canada. PetSmart stores sell pet food, pet supplies, pet accessories, and small pets. Stores also provide services including grooming, dog daycare, dog and cat boarding, veterinary care via in-store third-party clinics, and dog training. They also offer dog and cat adoption via in-store adoption centers facilitated by the non-profit PetSmart Charities.

Founded in 1986 by Jim and Janice Dougherty, the company opened its first two stores in 1987 in Phoenix, Arizona, under the name PetFood Warehouse, as warehouse-type stores that sold pet food in bulk at discount prices. Under new leadership the company changed its name to Pet Smart in 1989 and, along with expanding around the country, began a long-term shift away from visually unappealing discount warehouse stores to attractive stores that sold pet food and supplies and offered services such as grooming, adoption events, and vet visits. The company went public via an IPO in 1993, and thereafter increased its nationwide expansion and the types of goods and services it offered.

After opening nearly 300 stores in the United States, in 1996, the company expanded to Canada. Around the same time, it also bought and renamed a pet-store chain in the UK, but the over-priced purchase was a failure financially and operationally, and PETsMART sold the UK chain at a substantial loss to rival UK pet-store Pets at Home, in late 1999. The failed UK expansion brought a loss in profitability and a low point for PETsMART stock in 2000. The company's third CEO, Phil Francis, re-tooled the company by emphasizing employee training and customer service, overhauling operations and systems, redesigning stores for visual appeal, and marketing PETsMART as a one-stop shop for pet products and services. By 2002, the company had fully integrated its in-store, online, and catalog sales. Francis also led the opening of an average of 100 new stores per year from 2002 through 2009.

In 2005, the company changed its name to PetSmart and refocused its branding on "pet parents" who considered their pets part of their families. Differentiating itself by emphasizing its channel-exclusive brands and its in-store services such as grooming, dog training, day care and boarding, veterinary care, and adoption centers, the company nonetheless experienced encroaching competition from big-box stores and online e-tailers. The company was acquired by a private equity consortium led by BC Partners in March 2015. In May 2017 PetSmart purchased the online pet-products e-tailer Chewy as a largely independent subsidiary. Chewy went public in an IPO in June 2019; as of March 2021, PetSmart no longer owns Chewy and they are independently operated companies.

== Company history ==
=== Founding and expansion 1986–1993 ===
PetSmart is originally started as Pet Food Warehouse in 1986. The initial two stores opened their doors in 1987 in Phoenix. Jim and Janice Dougherty conceived the idea of a chain of discount pet-food warehouses, and, with the initial financial backing of Phillips-Van Heusen Corporation, incorporated under the name Pacific Coast Distributing in 1986. In 1987 they opened their first two superstores, in the Phoenix, Arizona, area, under the name PetFood Warehouse, offering pet food in large quantities for low prices, a new concept at the time. The stores welcomed customers and their pets, which was a first for the retail industry. In 1988 they opened five additional stores in Arizona, Colorado, and Texas, and PetFood Warehouse stores began working with local animal welfare groups to hold fundraising and pet adoption events.

By 1989 PetSmart (name changed from Petfood Warehouse in 1988) continued to grow and began the search for new investors. The company also hired retail veteran Samuel J. Parker as president and CEO. Jim Dougherty retired from PetSmart in January, 1991; thereafter he was retained on a consulting basis with the company. Janice Dougherty retired in 1992. Under Parker's direction, that year the company added pet grooming services in some stores, and departments for birds, fish, and small pets were added. In 1990 mobile vet clinics were brought to stores to administer vaccinations. Parker also redesigned stores to be more inviting, covering cement floors with tiles, widening and brightening aisles, and adding pet accessories and supplies.

Parker also led expansion into new markets in the southwest and California, and in 1992 PETsMART opened its 50th store and registered a profit for the first time. In-house grooming centers, veterinary clinics, and pet adoption centers began to be included in stores to create one-stop pet stores for services and supplies, and in 1992 PETsMART introduced its own private-label premium and value brands of cat and dog foods. In-store obedience training was offered. In 1993 Parker was elected Chairman of the company in addition to being President and CEO.

=== IPO, new services and expansion 1993–1998 ===
In July 1993, the company went public on the NASDAQ under the ticker "PETM". The infusion of capital allowed CEO Parker to expand aggressively across the country, and also to acquire regional and competing companies, in an effort to become the national leader in pet stores in an increasingly competitive market. Its 100th store was opened in 1994.

In 1994, PETsMART Charities, Inc. – now PetSmart Charities – was formed, an independent nonprofit organization to help save the lives of homeless pets by partnering with animal shelters. PETsMART had decided not to sell dogs and cats because of the hundreds of thousands of animals that are euthanized each year. Instead, via PetSmart Charities it donates space inside its stores to local humane societies and animal shelters for them to display homeless animals that customers can adopt. PetSmart Charities also offers grant funding and donations to animal-welfare programs and organizations. As of 2020, the organization had facilitated the adoption of more than 9 million dogs and cats.

Also in 1994, PETsMART signed a deal with Banfield Pet Hospital clinics to include their veterinary clinics, initially called VetSmart, in PETsMART stores. PetSmart received rent and a share of the profits from the clinics, and had a 20% ownership of Banfield. By 1996 each new PETsMART store included a clinic, and by 1997 there were vet clinics in 213 North American stores.

PETsMART entered the mail-order catalog business in April 1995, and by 1996 had acquired the leading pet-products catalog business in North America and a major equine products catalog business. PETsMART Direct, which encompassed several catalogs, was formed in October 1996.

In 1996, the company opened its first eight Canadian stores, and spread to the UK by acquiring and renaming Pet City, the UK's largest pet-products chain which had 50 stores at the time. Petsmart.com was initiated as an information website. By end of year PETsMART had 320 stores.

Parker had retired as CEO in 1995, naming Mark Hansen as his successor CEO while Parker remained on as chairman. Years of rapid expansion eventually exacerbated the company's lack of an adequate inventory infrastructure, resulting in heavy losses being reported in early 1997. Hansen resigned that year and Parker was brought back in to revive the company as chairman and CEO. He initiated a series of "Back to Basics" initiatives to get the company on track, and after it returned to profitability he resigned again in March 1998, whereupon board member Phil Francis became president and CEO.

=== New leadership begins 1998–2000 ===
New CEO Francis, a supermarket-chain veteran, emphasized employee training and customer service, and smaller stores with improved and more attractive design. He led PETsMART to increasingly leave behind the warehouse concept in favor of shopper experience, eventually focusing on providing shoppers with a combination of attractive prices, variety, customer service, in-store experience, and ancillary services. He also implemented major efficiencies and cost cuts in payroll, inventory, distribution, supply chain, and purchasing.

In 1998 PETsMART opened its 500th store, and by year's end had 423 stores in the U.S., 93 stores in the UK, and 18 in Canada.

Under Francis's direction, in 1999 the company launched an ad campaign promoting PETsMART as a one-stop shop for pet products and services. Medical Management International (MMI), the holding company of Banfield Pet Hospitals, managed all vet clinics in company stores by 1999, and PETsMART acquired a 36% stake in MMI. Eventually, in 2007 PetSmart sold off part of its stake in Banfield/MMI and divested the rest of the stake in 2015, and in 2018 the company began recruiting independent veterinary operators to house clinics inside its stores which did not yet have one.

Also in 1999, to compete with Pets.com, via a joint venture with Idealab the website Petsmart.com became an e-commerce site and a subsidiary of PETsMART. In 2000 PETsMART increased its 49.9% stake in Petsmart.com to 81%, and in January 2002 acquired the site outright for an additional $9.5 million. It fully integrated its online operations and marketing with its existing brick-and-mortar business and with its direct-marketing catalog business. In December 2000 it had also acquired the domain name Pets.com from the newly defunct e-tailer, and redirected all of its web traffic to Petsmart.com.

The 1996 overpriced acquisition of the British chain store Pet City and its transformation into PETsMART UK had proved disastrous financially and operationally, and in late 1999 PETsMART sold its acquisition back to a different UK pet retailer, Pets at Home, at a substantial loss.

=== Rejuvenation and North American growth 2000–2005 ===
Although sales went up by over 5% in 2000, the company recorded a $31 million loss for the year, and in mid 2000 its stock price hit an all-time low. In an attempt to bolster growth, the company adopted a new vision statement, "to provide Total Lifetime Care for every pet, every parent, every time." PETsMART began remodeling all of its stores, creating a new store format that was warmer and friendlier and organized by pet type, and adding emphasis on in-store customer service; by the end of 2003, all stores had the new format. In 2000 the company also re-prioritized and expanded its in-store services such as dog training and grooming. It also acquired the pet boarding company PetsHotels Plus; afterwards, two in-store PETsMART PetsHotels were tested in 2002 in Phoenix. By the end of 2008 over 100 stores had PetsHotels offering daycare for dogs and boarding for dogs and cats, and by 2020 there were eight stand-alone PetsHotels and hotels in 207 stores.

In 2001, the company laid out a three-year plan to expand in-store services and products and provide high-quality customer service, and began an extensive training program for its employees, to help them identify customers' needs and provide solutions. In line with its new vision statement, a new ad campaign debuted, "All You Need for the Life of Your Pet".

By early 2002, PETsMART's stock had recovered, more than quadrupling from its low in mid 2000. By the end of 2002 there were Banfield Pet Hospitals in more than half of its 583 stores, PETsMART had eight distribution centers around the country, and the company embarked on a major new expansion opening an average of 100 new stores annually between 2002 and 2009.

In 2004, the company launched its PetPerks loyalty card program, which offered promotional discounts and customization to shoppers, allowing PETsMART to also individually promote services or products a given customer had not yet used and to determine the effectiveness of each promotion and the strongest customer brand loyalties. The company also tested its new concept, Doggie Day Camp daycare for dogs, in a store in Pasadena.

=== Rename and rebranding 2005–2013 ===
In 2005, PETsMART rebranded itself PetSmart and embraced a new concept and image which focused on "pet parents" and the trend of humanizing pets. It introduced a major television ad campaign appealing to pet owners who treated their pets as children or considered them family members. The rebranding repositioned the company as a petcare specialist, offering services and specialty products rather than just a big-box discount mart. A new store format, including revamped signage and displays, easier navigation, and in-store pet training centers, accompanied the change in focus. PetSmart tightened its focus further in 2007 by exiting its equine business.

By 2008 PetSmart had 1000 stores in the U.S. and Canada.

By the mid to late 2000s PetSmart was beginning to experience significant competition from Amazon, Walmart, and Target; Walmart had entered heavily into the pet supplies market and was also beginning to offer services such as grooming. The company's direct competitor is Petco, a nationwide big-box pet supplies retailer that was sold to private equity owners in 2006.

In June 2009, Bob Moran, President and Chief Operating Officer of PetSmart, became CEO, succeeding Francis, who became executive chairman of the board until 2012. Moran's vision was to slow the opening of new stores, and to focus instead on improving store productivity by pursuing the company's differentiation strategy, and on reaching its target market and improving its customer focus, especially regarding the humanization of animals.

In 2010 PetSmart began to launch a series of exclusive products based on partnerships with high-profile entities like GNC and Martha Stewart, leading to the GNC Pets and Martha Stewart Pets lines. These were followed by other exclusive product partnerships, including with Bret Michaels, Toys "R" Us, Marvel Comics, and Tommy Bahama and in 2017 with Ellen DeGeneres.

In a planned management succession, after four years at the helm of the company, Moran retired as CEO in June 2013 and was replaced by then President and COO David K. Lenhardt.

=== Private equity ownership 2014 to present ===
Although it continued to differentiate itself by stressing and broadening its in-store services such as boarding, grooming, dog training, and veterinary care, by 2014, with the increasing competition from online e-tailers PetSmart's profits began to slide, prompting activist investors to call for a buy-out of the company beginning in mid 2014.

The winner in the bidding war was a consortium of private equity investors led by BC Partners, which completed a leveraged buyout of PetSmart for $8.7 billion in March 2015. The company ceased trading on the NASDAQ, and Lenhardt stepped down as CEO, replaced by Michael Massey, formerly CEO of Payless ShoeSource's parent Collective Brands.

Massey and BC Partners replaced seven senior PetSmart managers and a significant portion of VP-level employees, and reorganized the company for quick decision-making. Massey strategically shifted pricing, recalculated inventory shipping, reduced expenses, improved profit margins, and created a 30-person sourcing team in Asia for PetSmart's hard goods.

This overhaul led to an initial increase in profitability, followed by declining sales in PetSmart's brick-and-mortar stores due to online competition. To combat this PetSmart purchased the still-unprofitable yet popular pet e-commerce site Chewy as a largely independent subsidiary in May 2017 for $3.35 billion. Added to its debt acquired from its 2015 leveraged buyout, this brought PetSmart's total debt load to $8 billion, which reached $8.6 billion as of February 2019.

PetSmart CEO Massey abruptly resigned in August 2017; pending a replacement Raymond Svider, managing partner at BC Partners, served as executive chairman and oversaw the company with its senior leadership team. In May 2018 J.K. Symancyk, previously CEO of Academy Sports + Outdoors, was appointed the new CEO. In June 2018, PetSmart transferred a 20% stake in Chewy to its BC Partners–led parent holding company, and also transferred a 16.5% holding in Chewy to a wholly owned "unrestricted subsidiary" of PetSmart; these transactions kept a substantial portion of Chewy out of reach of PetSmart's creditors.

Chewy went public in an IPO in June 2019. PetSmart used the proceeds of the IPO to pay down some of its debt. Chewy temporarily remained an independent subsidiary of PetSmart, with PetSmart as its majority owner. In late 2020, it was announced that Chewy and PetSmart would split to operate as separate companies.

In March 2026, comedian musician Ben Lapidus released the music video "PETSMART," which humorously questioned the interpretation of the pet supply retailer PetSmart's name and branding. In the video, Lapidus questions whether the company's name and logo are intended to read as "Pet Smart," suggesting pets themselves are intelligent, or "Pet's Mart," implying a marketplace for pets. PetSmart responded to the video later that evening on its official Facebook page, stating that the company's name is intended to be read as "Pet Smart."

== Leadership ==
Since 1989 the CEOs of the company have been:

- Samuel J. Parker (1989–1995)
- Mark Hansen (1995–1997)
- Samuel J. Parker (interim; 1997–1998)
- Phil Francis (1998–2009)
- Bob Moran (2009–2013)
- David Lenhardt (2013–2015)
- Michael J. Massey (2015–2017)
- J.K. Symancyk (2018–2024)
- Ken C. Hicks (2024-Present)

== Controversies ==
In January 2016, PETA released details of an investigation of Holmes Farm, a major supplier of live animals to Petsmart, Petco and Pet Supplies Plus, which highlighted abusive conditions at what is described as a complex of "filthy, windowless warehouses." Small animals such as rabbits, hamsters, rats, mice and gerbils were confined to overcrowded bins and often drank from contaminated water bowls or had no water altogether. Cats, who freely roamed around the facilities, regularly jumped in and out of bins and preyed on the animals within them. PETA's investigators reported that, during their observations, injured animals never received veterinary care, but instead were piled by the dozens in "feces-smeared coolers" and then gassed to death with carbon monoxide; others were put into ziplock bags and frozen to death. Over the span of roughly three months, PETA's investigator found hundreds of dead animals at the complex, often in habitats which contained no drinking water. In May 2016, PetSmart ceased utilizing the rodent dealer Holmes Farm, Inc. in Barto, Pennsylvania, after the dealer was cited for multiple infractions by the U.S. Department of Agriculture during an inspection. The USDA inspection of the rodent dealer had followed the undercover investigation launched in late 2015 by the People for the Ethical Treatment of Animals (PETA).

In February 2016, another PETA investigation discovered rampant abuse and neglect at Mack, an Ohio reptile mill and a supplier for Petsmart, including, among other things, frogs, lizards, turtles and other animals being "crammed into filthy, crowded plastic bins stacked into shelving units like old bank statements. Living beings deprived of water for days or even weeks. Sick and injured animals denied veterinary care. Emaciated, severely dehydrated animals desperate for water. Animals cruelly killed by being gassed or frozen to death." The investigation did not find any abuse from PetSmart employees. The company released a statement saying "We are reviewing the matter internally, and if we find that our standards have not been met, we will take appropriate action immediately."

An undercover operation by a PETA employee who got jobs at three PetSmart stores in Arizona, Florida, and Tennessee led to a raid of a PetSmart store in Nashville by authorities in March 2018. Six sick or injured small animals – a guinea pig, mice, and hamsters – were confiscated from the store and sent to a veterinary hospital after video and photos were presented by the PETA operative. Three employees of the Nashville store – the store manager, assistant store manager, and customer engagement manager – pleaded guilty to animal cruelty in June 2018 and were sentenced to 20 hours of community service and ordered to pay the veterinary bills for the animals seized by Nashville animal care and control authorities. In June 2018 PetSmart filed suit against the undercover employee, on the grounds that she failed to disclose on her job application that she was a paid PETA operative, took secret surveillance videos and photos, and withheld medical care from the animals in question, instead filming them to produce an exposé. In May 2019 PetSmart added PETA to the lawsuit as a defendant, describing it as a "militant, activist organization" that has "a long history of conducting unlawful, covert operations and infiltrations to eradicate pet ownership".

In September 2018 NJ Advance Media published the results of a nine-month investigation documenting 47 cases across 14 states since 2008 in which families said their dog had died during or shortly after a grooming visit to PetSmart. Thirty-two of the cases occurred after the start of 2015, the year the private-equity buyout of the company was finalized. In PetSmart's response it said "We reviewed the list of pet names that NJ Advance Media provided, and any assertion that there is a systemic problem is false and fabricated."

In 2021 and 2022 reports published by Vice Media, United for Respect, and World Animal Protection found that since the company was acquired by private equity firm BC Partners in a 2014 leveraged buyout, cost cutting has resulted in unsafe working conditions, inadequate training, understaffing, lack of supplies, consolidation of jobs, and increased animal deaths at multiple PetSmart stores, with freezers overfilled with dead animals. Former employees have reported that PetSmart managers would ask them to take dead animals with them after their shift to dispose of them off the clock.

In July 2025, PetSmart was sued by Colorado Attorney General Phil Weiser, with the lawsuit alleging that the company tricked prospective dog groomers into signing training repayment agreement provision contracts (or TRAPs), "that required them to stay with the company for years or risk paying thousands of dollars."
