= Sistema de Pagamentos em Moeda Local =

Sistema de Pagamentos em Moeda Local (SML, Local Currency Payment System) is a system for clearing transactions between Brazil and Argentina in local currency (without using the SWIFT payment system).

SML makes life easier for small producers, which until then traded goods only locally, in their own currencies. They no longer have to convert to US dollars or calculate exchange-rates.

== History ==
SML was established on October 3, 2008.

In the first year Brazilians and Argentines only used the SML in transactions involving goods, but central banks are considering enabling operations of trade in services and payments of social benefits.

Initially, SML was used only in transactions between Brazil and Argentina. Brazilian Central Bank is considering expansion to other countries like Uruguay and Paraguay. Russia, India and China showed interest in adopting the system in bilateral trade with Brazil.

The system includes central bank-authorized financial institutions. Transactions are made between the financial institutions and Central Banks. The importers and exporters fix their prices using the SML-rate published by the Central Banks.

== See also ==
- Central Bank of Argentina
