= St Mary's Church, Longfleet =

Church in Poole, Dorset, England

St Mary's Church
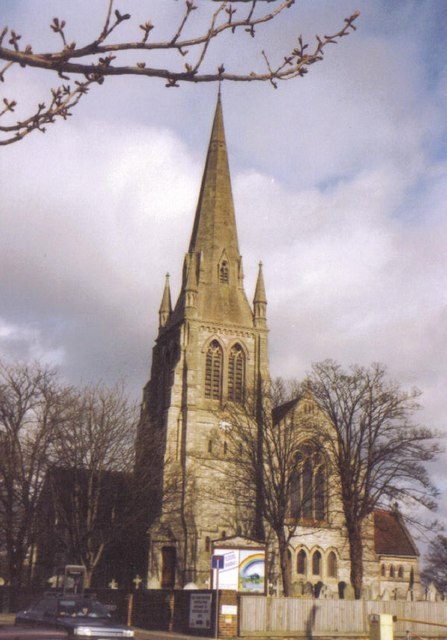
- St Mary's Church
- St Mary's Church
- 50°43′22″N 1°58′18″W
- Denomination: Church of England
- Churchmanship: charismatic evangelical
- Website: www.smlpoole.org.uk

History
- Dedication: Virgin Mary

Architecture
- Heritage designation: Grade II; ID: 412520
- Architect: Edward Blore
- Style: Gothic Revival
- Years built: 1830-33

Administration
- Province: Canterbury
- Diocese: Salisbury
- Archdeaconry: Dorset
- Deanery: Poole and North Bournemouth
- Parish: Longfleet

Clergy
- Vicar: Revd. Jordan Betts

St Mary's, Longfleet (SML or SML Poole) is a Church of England parish church in Longfleet, a district of Poole, in the ceremonial county of Dorset, on the south coast of England. It is part of the New Wine network and describes itself as an evangelical charismatic church.

== Location ==
St Mary's is located on the south side of Longfleet Road, just above Poole Hospital. It has a prominent spire that may be seen for miles around.

== History ==
St. Mary's is a Gothic Revival church that was built in the years 1830–33 and consecrated on 25 September 1833. It built chiefly at the expense of Lord de Mauley and was originally designed by Edward Blore, but has been considerably modified since. In 1863, a chancel and organ chamber were added by G. E. Street and the year 1884 saw the western end enhanced by a spire, 135 feet (41 m) high, erected by G. R. Crickmay and Son. The spire was donated by William Pearce JP, a 19th-century Mayor of Poole, who resided at nearby Springfield House. There was further remodelling in 1915 which saw the nave rebuilt with aisles and transepts by Herbert Kendell of Poole. According to English Heritage, "in spite of a surprisingly complicated development, the church is an effective composition, whose major accent, the northwest tower and spire, is one of Poole's most important landmarks."

In 1995 the church was assessed as a Grade II listed building.

Longfleet parish was formed in 1837 from Great Canford. Its boundaries changed in 1946 when part of Longfleet became the new parish of Oakdale St George. The living was, and still is, a vicarage in the Diocese of Salisbury. Its patron in the 1870s was Sir J. B. Guest, Bart., who owned Canford Manor, now Canford School.

== Today ==
St. Mary's describes itself as a "vibrant evangelical charismatic Church" and "a large multi-generational church with an informal atmosphere." The church is part of the New Wine Network and, has a congregation of around 700, which is the largest in the Diocese of Salisbury.

The church continues to serve the local community and has several Sunday School classes as well as ministries for men, women, youth, pastoral care, outreach and worship. It is very active and works with local authorities, e.g. through Faithworks Wessex, running projects like MON£Y MATT£RS, a money management and debt advice service, and Befrienders, linking up with people who are in need of companionship. The church also has close links with Longfleet Church of England Primary School, which was formerly opposite on Longfleet Road.

The previous incumbent, Rev. Andrew Perry, became the vicar of St. Mary's in 1995 and has overseen the church as its community has grown from 80 to around 800. He was installed as a canon of Salisbury Cathedral on 3 July 2012.

The current incumbent, Revd Jordan Betts, became vicar on 14th October 2026.

== Church centre ==
In August 2011, St Mary's was granted planning permission to redevelop its church centre as a facility for the church and local community. The church centre is in Kingston Road, but faces the church itself across Longfleet Road. Work commenced in May 2013 and a pelican crossing over Longfleet Road was installed.

The new church centre was completed in May 2014 and officially opened on 23 September 2014 at a celebration attended by the Bishop of Salisbury, Nicholas Holtam. It is used regularly by Poole Hospital and local health charities.

== Church graft ==
In April 2018, SML sent a new vicar, Rev. Tessa Nisbet, and around 20 church members to lead a 'church graft' at St Michael's Church, Hamworthy, and St Gabriel's Church, Turlin Moor, in order to bring a new lease of life to the local community and turn around declining congregations.

== Gallery ==
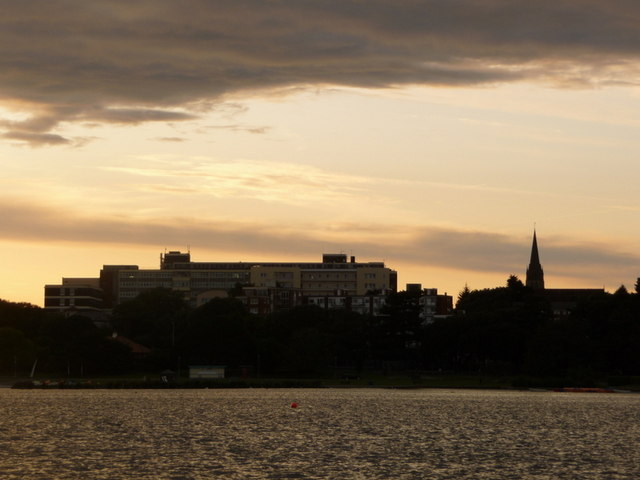
Poole Hospital and the spire of St Mary's seen across Poole Park Lake

== See also ==
- Longfleet
- List of ecclesiastical works by Edward Blore
- List of church restorations and alterations by G. E. Street
