= Leonard Gurle =

British plant nurseryman

Leonard (Captain) Gurle (c.1621-1685), sometimes spelled Garle or Garrle, established one of the earliest plant nurseries in post reformation Britain, selling both ornamental plants and fruit trees.

A 12-acre site next to Brick Lane in Whitechapel was already "a nurcery and garden plott" by 1643, although the earliest evidence of Gurle being in occupation is a 1656 lease from George Montagu. By 1661 he had raised the improved nectarine, which he called Elruge (later referred to as the Elruge of Philip Miller). The list of fruit he sold may be found in The English Gardener by Leonard Meager (c. 1624–c. 1704). From 1672 he was providing Roger Pratt not only with fruit but also a range of ornamental and forest trees.

In 1677 he succeeded John Rose (1619–77), as gardener to the Charles II at St James's Palace. The probate inventory taken after his death lists household goods in his private residence at Whitechapel and his official residence as royal gardener at St James's, plants in the garden at Whitechapel, the king's greenhouse at St James's and at a small 2 acre nursery in Hackney. The total of his inventory was over £3,825, of which £2,500 was owing from the Crown. The debt from the Crown was still unpaid, when Gurle's widow Joyce died in 1688. At the time of his death Gurle had a son William and three daughters:Rebecca, Margaret and Jane.
