= 6 Patrick Pool =

Listed building in York, England

- The pub in 2025
- Alternative names: Pivni

General information
- Type: Warehouse, later shop; now public house
- Location: Patrick Pool, York, England
- Coordinates: 53°57′35″N 1°04′51″W
- Completed: c. 1600; 426 years ago
- Renovated: c. 1960 (restored)
- Owner: Pivovar

Technical details
- Floor count: 3 + attic

Design and construction
- Designations

Listed Building – Grade II*
- Official name: 6, Patrick Pool
- Designated: 25 March 1950
- Reference no.: 1256976

Website
- pivni.co.uk

6 Patrick Pool is a Grade II* listed building in the city centre of York, England. Built around 1600, its original purpose is uncertain, and it was later used as stables in the 18th century and as a warehouse in the 19th century. It was restored around 1960. Since 2007 it has housed the Pivni bar, described by the Campaign for Real Ale as an "outstanding pub conversion".

== History ==
It was constructed in about 1600. Its original use is uncertain, and may have been social, or have been connected with the neighbouring St Sampson's Church. Alternatively, it may have been used as a warehouse. In the 18th century, it was converted into stables, and then in the 19th century into a warehouse.

On 25 March 1950, No. 6 was designated a Grade II* listed building. By the mid-20th century, the building was in poor repair, but it was restored around 1960. In 1968 the site was included within the newly established Central Historic Core conservation area.

In 2007, it became the Pivni bar, which in 2022 was one of 17 York pubs listed in the Good Beer Guide. The Campaign for Real Ale regards it as an "outstanding pub conversion". As of September 2024 the freehold is owned by Pivovar.

== Architecture ==
The building is timber‑framed with plastered brick‑tile infill, and both long sides have jettied upper floors. The rear wall has been partly rebuilt in orange brick, and the roof is tiled. The street front has three storeys and three bays, with a shopfront on the ground floor that includes a recessed glazed door in the right‑hand bay and plate‑glass windows, while the other bays contain three‑light timber casements. The upper floors have two‑light casement windows set irregularly between the exposed studding.

At the rear, the second floor projects over the lower storeys, with only the posts visible at first‑floor level and the full framing exposed above. The ground floor has a replacement door to the left, a three‑light window in the centre, and a small fixed light to the right, all beneath timber lintels. Each first‑floor bay has a two‑light window, and the outer bays on the second floor have three‑light casements. The right‑hand return has three storeys and an attic gable, with exposed framing on all levels and two‑light casements on the upper floors. All windows are leaded‑light casements.

=== Interior ===
Inside, the timber framing survives intact, and the building shows no evidence of original internal partitions or heating. The roof structure uses clasped purlins supported by short timbers fixed to the main vertical members, and the attic retains its original lime-ash floor.

== See also ==
- Grade II* listed buildings in the City of York
- Listed buildings in York (within the city walls, northern part)
