= Great Moreton Hall =

Location map and quick summary
Great Moreton Hall
- Location in Cheshire
- 53.1324°N 2.2414°W
- Location: Moreton cum Alcumlow, Cheshire, England
- OS grid reference: SJ 839 595
History
- Built: 1841
- Built for: George Holland Ackers
Site notes
- Architect: Edward Blore
Listed Building – Grade II*
- Official name: Great Moreton Hall
- Designated: 14 February 1967
- Reference no.: 1138736

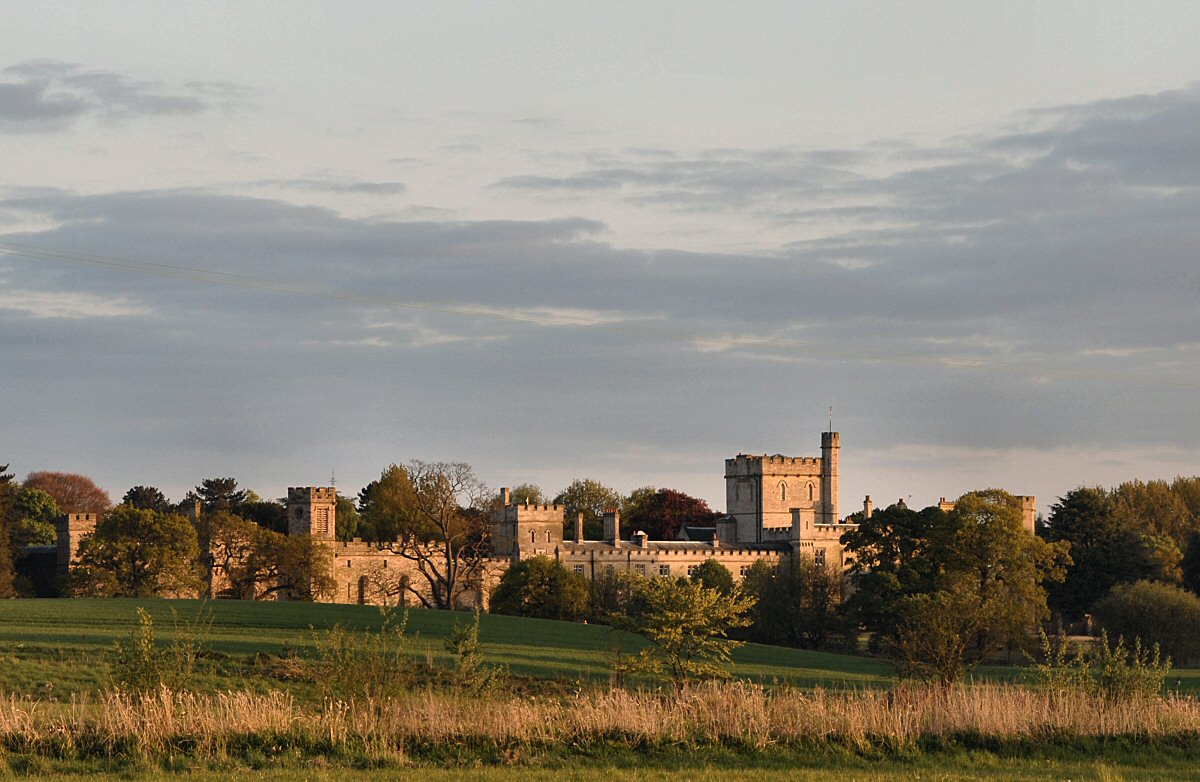
Great Moreton Hall from the southwest

Great Moreton Hall is a former country house in Moreton cum Alcumlow near Congleton, in Cheshire, England, less than a mile (1.6 km) from its better-known near namesake Little Moreton Hall. Designed by Edward Blore, it was built in 1841 by Manchester businessman George Holland Ackers, to replace a large timber-framed building that had been the home of the Bellot family since 1602. Great Moreton Hall is built in two storeys, interspersed with three and four-storey towers. The service wing to the left of and adjoining the main part of the building is slightly lower than the rest of the structure.

The main entrance is via a broad flight of steps from a porte-cochère, leading to the entrance lobby and a large central hall. A triple arcade at one end of the hall leads to the main staircase, opposite a hooded fireplace decorated with the arms of the Ackers family. The Library, Drawing Room, Billiard Room, Saloon, and the Great Hall are arranged symmetrically around the central hall. "Dark narrow internal corridors" allowed the servants, whose quarters were in the cellars, to reach all the rooms without having to pass through the central hall.

Great Moreton Hall was designated a Grade II* listed building on 14 February 1967. Since 1931 the house has served first as a school and then as a hotel and conference centre. Great Moreton Hall has been in private ownership since 1992. HM Land Registry

== See also ==
- Grade II* listed buildings in Cheshire East
- Listed buildings in Moreton cum Alcumlow
