= Leadlight =

Type of windows

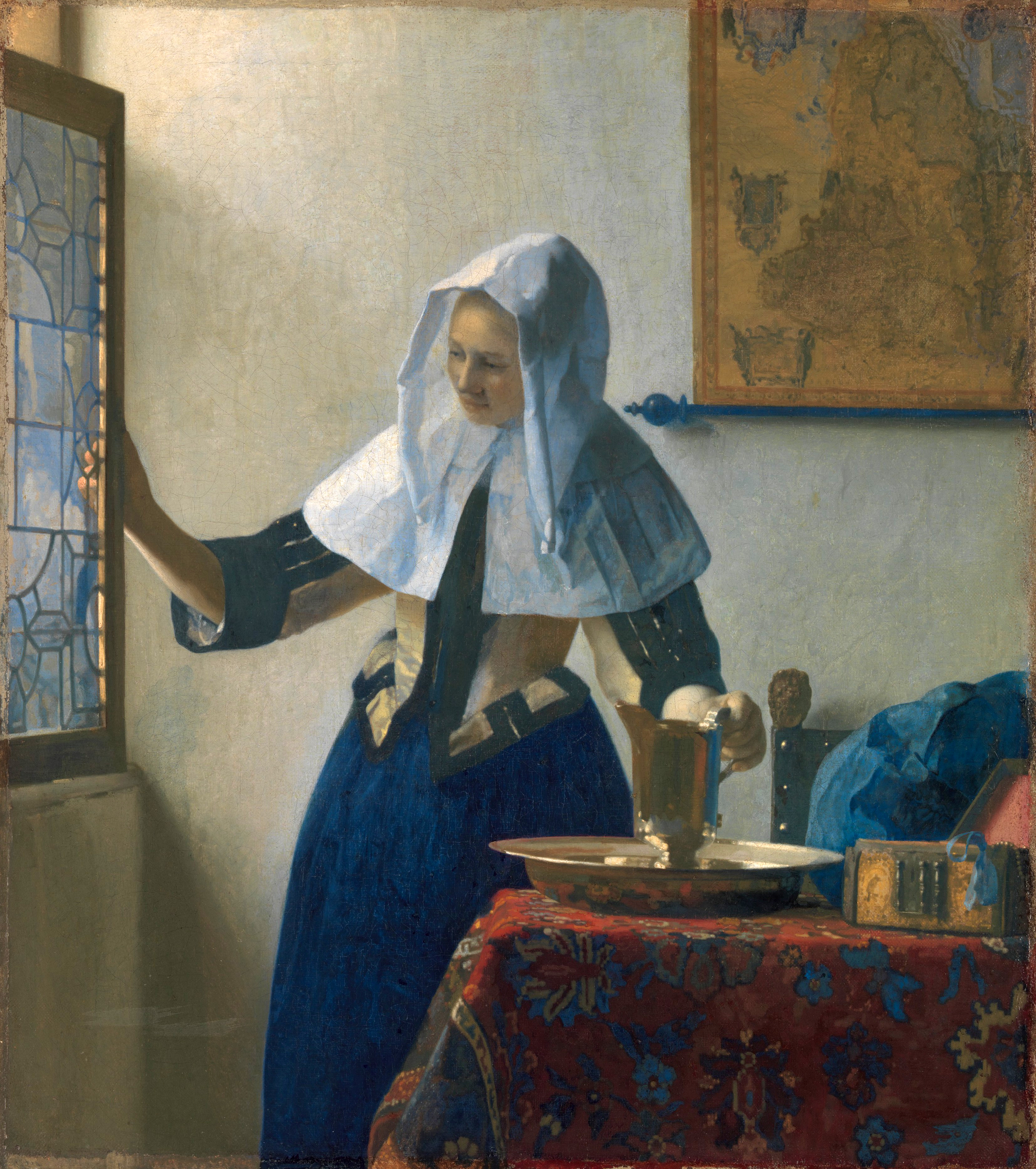
Domestic interior by Jan Vermeer showing a leadlight casement window

Leadlights, leaded lights or leaded windows are decorative windows made of small sections of glass supported in lead cames. The technique of creating windows using glass and lead is known as came glasswork. The term "leadlight" could be used to describe any window in which the glass is supported by lead, but traditionally, a distinction is made between stained glass windows and leadlights; the former is associated with the ornate coloured-glass windows of churches and similar buildings, while the latter is associated with the windows of vernacular architecture and defined by its simplicity.

Since the traditional technique of setting glass into lead cames is the same in both cases, the division between "leadlights" and "stained glass" became less distinct during the late 20th century. The terms are now often incorrectly used interchangeably for any window employing the lead-support technique, while the term "stained glass" is often applied to any windows, sculptures, or works of art using coloured glass.

== Traditional leadlight ==
Traditionally, leadlight windows differ from stained glass windows principally in being less complex in design and employing simpler techniques of manufacture. Stained glass windows, such as those commonly found in churches, usually include design components that have been painted onto the glass and fired in a kiln before assembly. The extra time and cost employed in painting and firing the glass usually prohibited its use in domestic architecture. While stained glass windows are found principally in churches and ornate buildings, leadlight windows, which rarely employ painted components, are much more common, and from the 1860s to the 1930s were a regular architectural feature in many private houses and cottages, where their style is often a clue to the age of the building.

Unlike stained glass windows, which are traditionally pictorial or of elaborate design, traditional leadlight windows are generally non-pictorial, containing geometric designs and formalised plant motifs. Leadlight windows almost always employ the use of quarries, pieces of glass cut into regular geometric shapes, sometimes square, rectangular or circular but most frequently diamond-shaped, creating a "diaper" pattern.

A further difference between traditional stained glass and leadlight is that the former almost always has painted pictorial details over much of the glass, requiring separate firing after painting by the artist. This is not the case in traditional leadlight, with painted quarries being separately produced and leaded in with those of plain glass, in the form of armorial crests and occasionally small scenes painted in grisaille (grey). Quarries painted in grisaille were employed both in the Medieval period and in the 19th century, the most famous ancient windows to have been decorated in this manner being in York Minster; these have inspired many 19th century imitations painted with little birds.

Quarries may be mould-cast into patterns such as fleur de lys and imprinted with black and yellow stain. Used extensively during the 19th century in England and Commonwealth countries, these quarries are often the product of a single studio: namely, James Powell and Sons of Whitefriars. Another form of decorative quarry is the etched or engraved quarry, which is made of flashed glass, most often ruby red or royal blue over a transparent layer. It then has a design cut into it using either acid or a lathe, the character of the resultant design differing accordingly. Etched quarries of Venetian glass are often employed, sometimes in conjunction with panels of stained glass, particularly in Italy and Eastern Europe. Lathe-cut quarries with a simple star-burst pattern are very common in the late 19th century domestic architecture of many regions, both in leadlighting and in simpler wooden-framed glazing.

The colours employed in leadlight windows may range from delicate pastels to intense hues. The glass used may be textured, patterned, or bevelled (as in the small panel from the 1920s illustrated below). However, since the windows are generally non-pictorial and are primarily intended to illuminate the interior, with or without a decorative function, the glass is usually of pale hue or transparent.

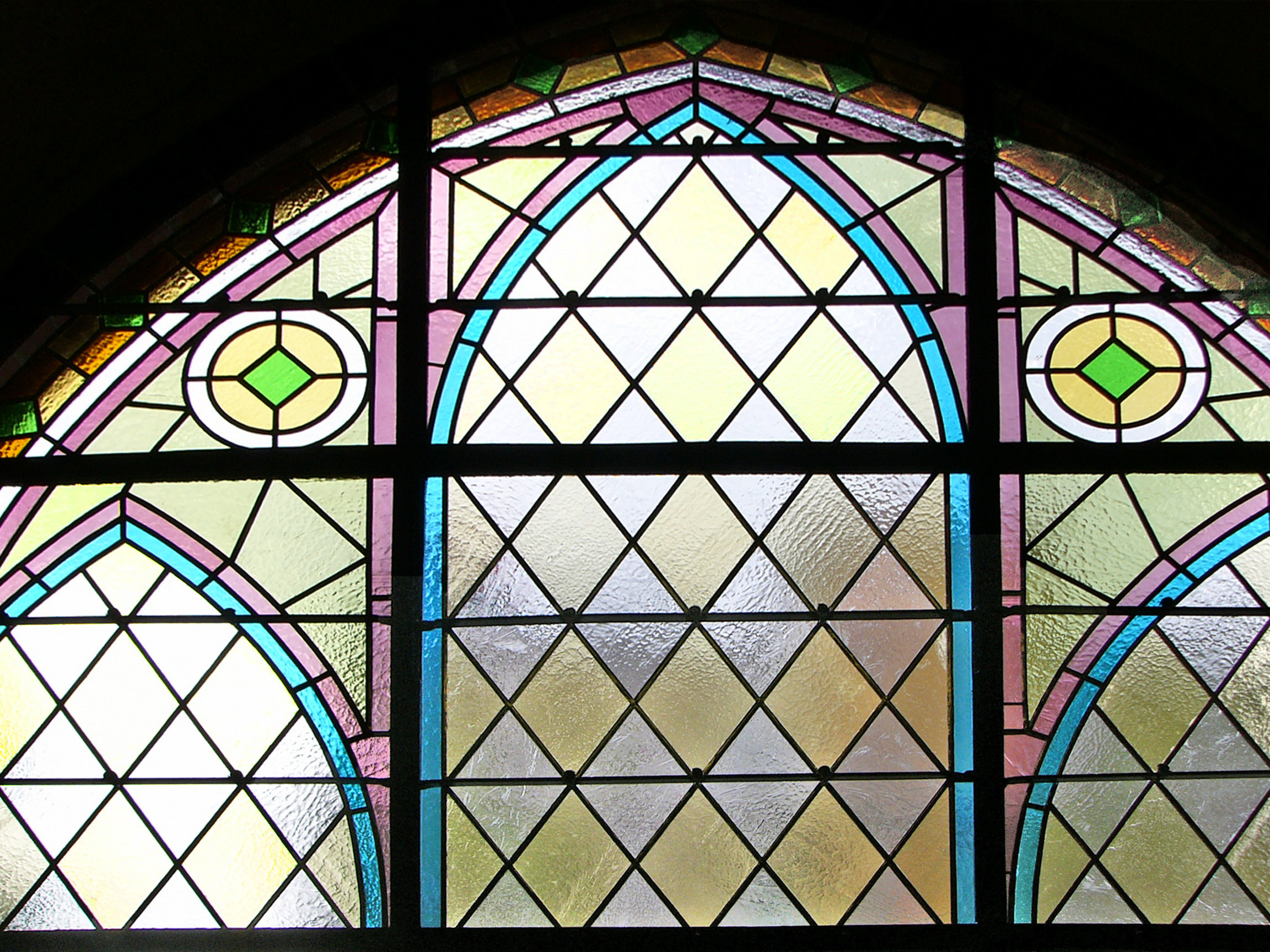
A leadlight church window, Czech Republic, combines traditional diamond panes with the pale translucent and textured quality of modern so-called "cathedral glass".

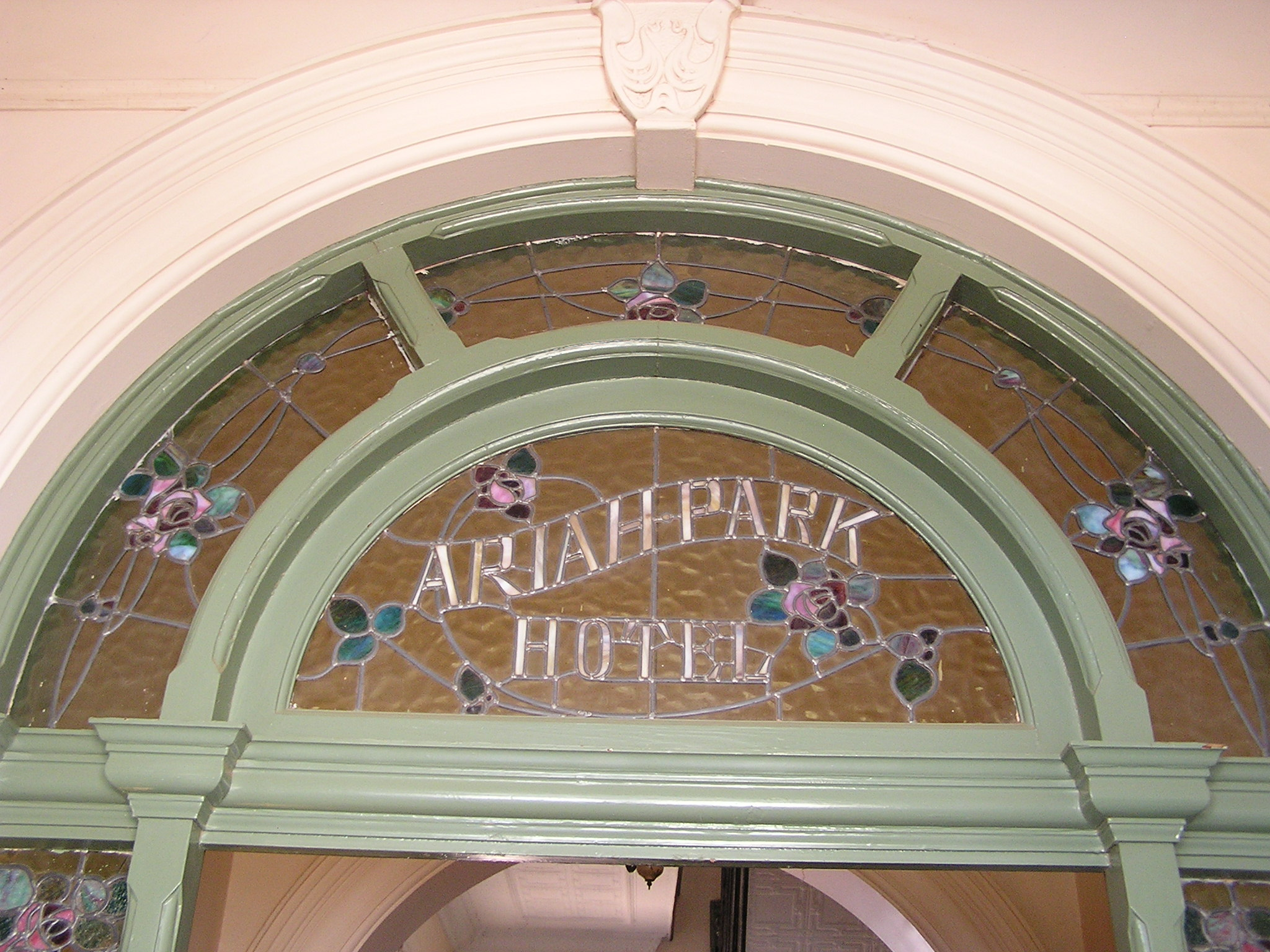
This domestic leadlighting above the residential entrance of a 19th-century Australian hotel shows a use of opaque glass which allows the name to be visible both by day and night.

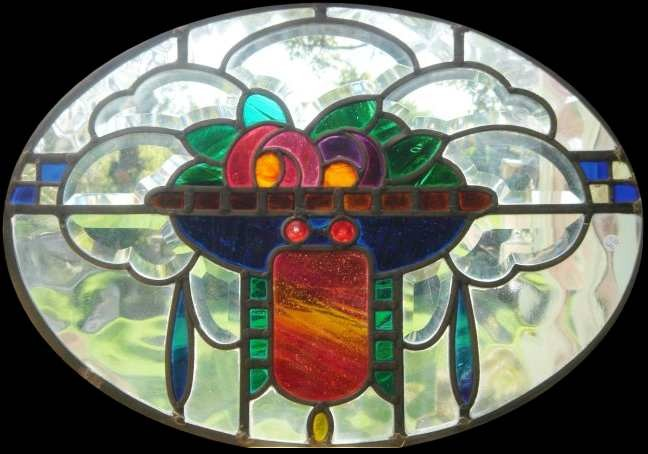
Domestic leadlight (1920s) employs an Art Deco motif in brightly coloured opalescent glass set in transparent glass, which is both textured and cut with bevelled edges to reflect the light.

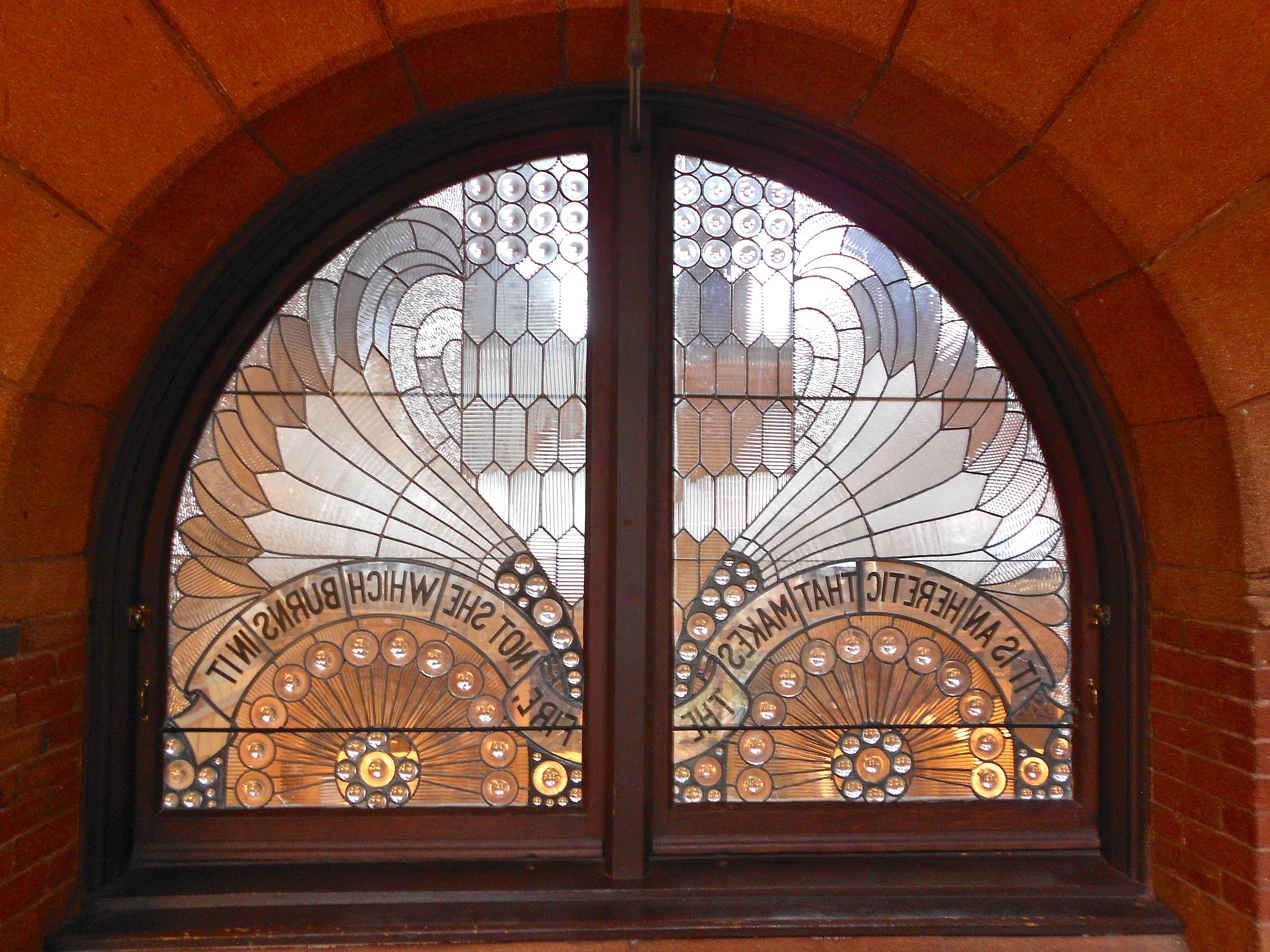
A highly detailed design by Frank Furness for the University of Pennsylvania Library (1888–90), Philadelphia.

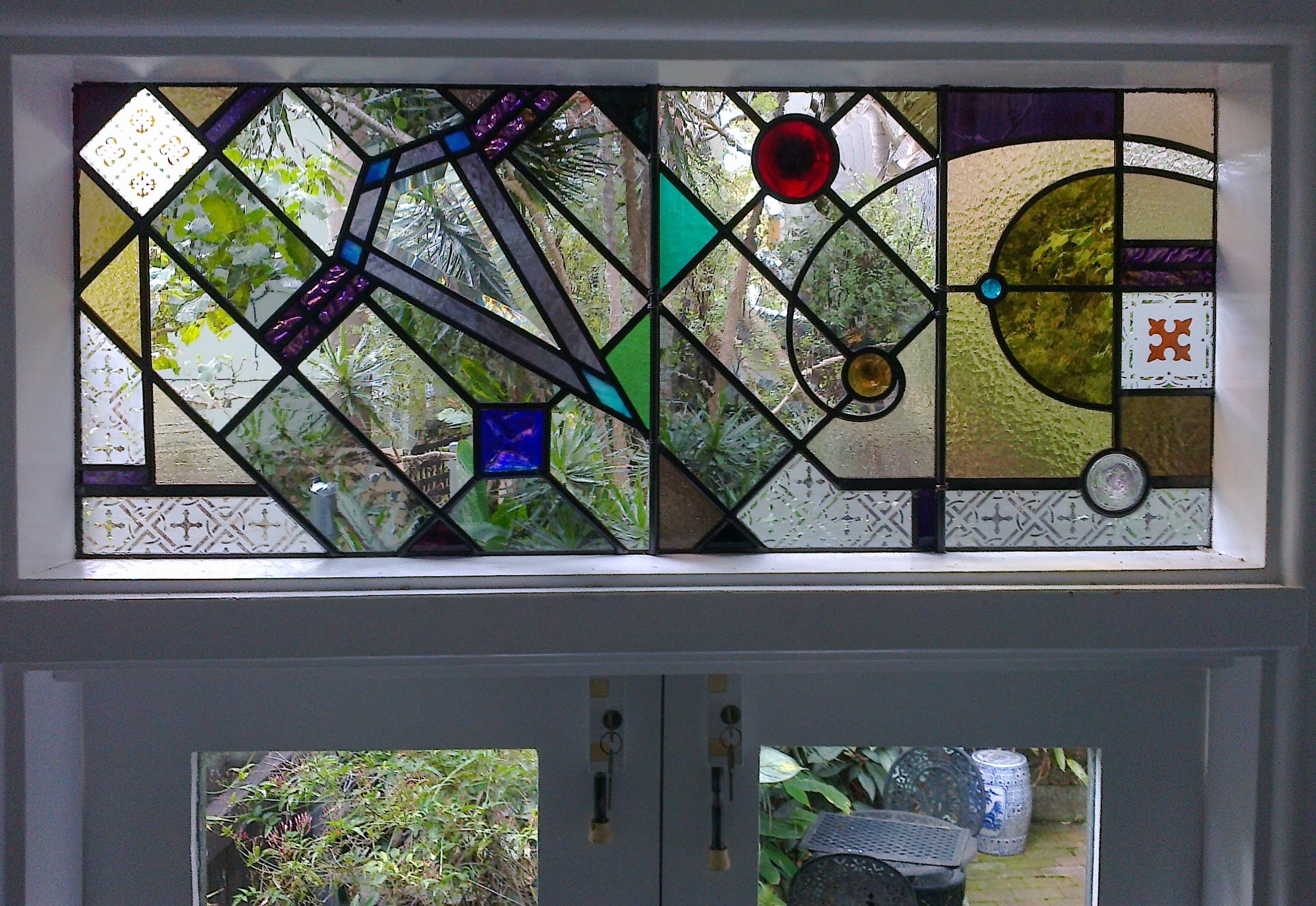
Fanlight to a kitchen using a wide variety of types of glass. Jeffrey Hamilton, 2021. (by permission of artist)

== Origin and continuity ==
The work of the leadlighter was essentially to provide windows that excluded the weather, but admitted light into buildings. Leadlight has been in use for over a thousand years, having its origins in the Roman and Byzantine windows that were made of thin sheets of alabaster set in armatures of wood or wrought iron. With the employment of small pieces of glass as the translucent material (rather than alabaster), lead "cames" of H-section were used to hold the glass in place, with the iron armatures being retained as support for larger windows.

By the late Middle Ages, the profession of domestic leadlighter was common across Europe. Until World War II, most towns had a commercial shop producing domestic leadlight. These craftsmen did not refer to their product as "stained glass". The provision of decorative stained glass windows was a task requiring many more complex skills than the provision of domestic leadlight. However, some of the major stained glass studios that produced church windows also produced leadlight for commercial and domestic buildings, so that the division became blurred; the leadlights, particularly for public buildings, were occasionally very ornate, as in the windows of Central Railway Station, Sydney.

In the late 20th and early 21st centuries, the previously accepted division between leadlight and stained glass had almost disappeared, with the terms "stained glass" and "leadlight" often being used interchangeably. This is because the techniques of construction of a pictorial stained glass window and a domestic leadlight window are basically the same, and any glass that is coloured or carries a stain is generally referred to as stained glass.

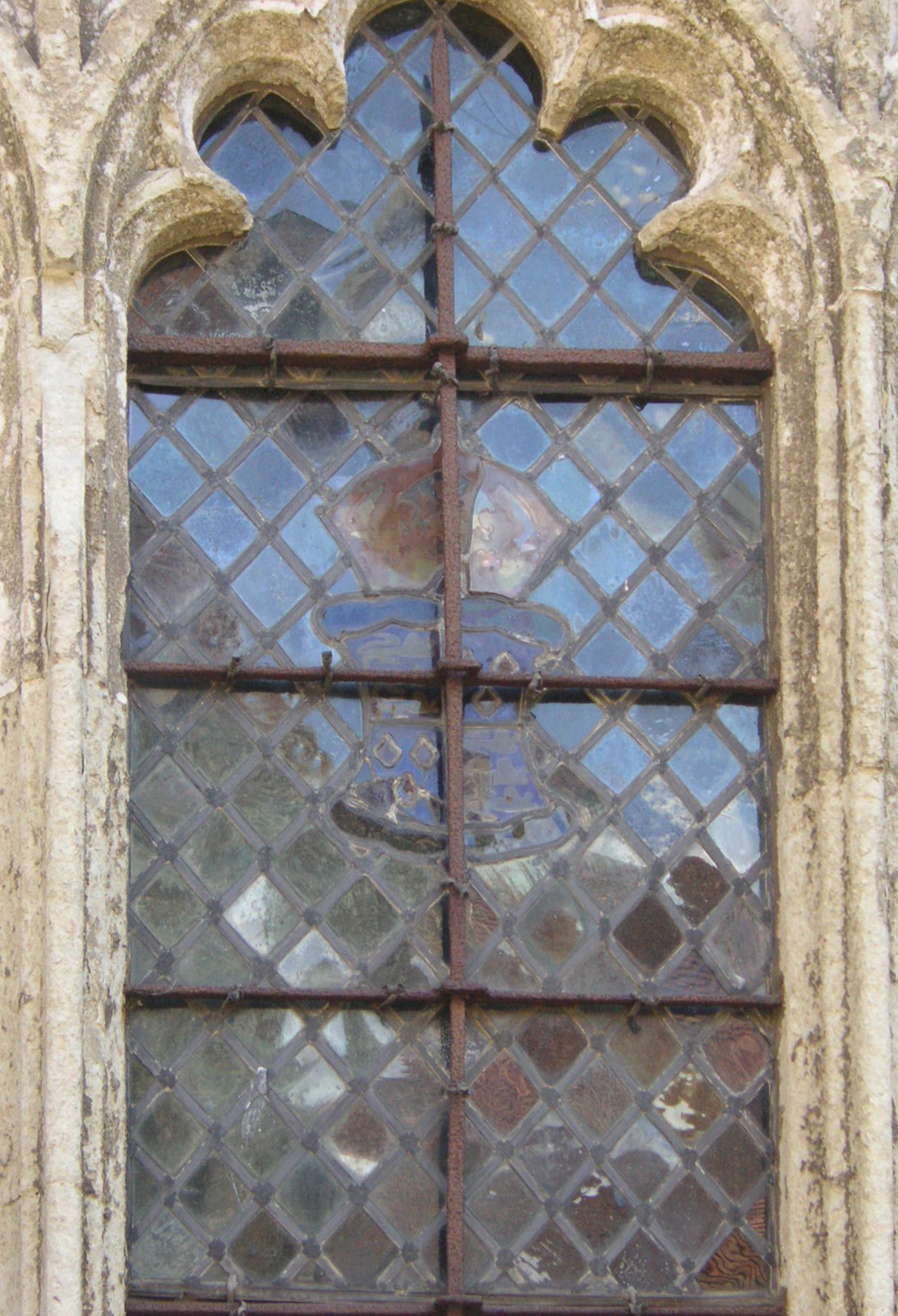
Medieval diamond pane and armorial glass at Ightham Mote, England, seen from the exterior.

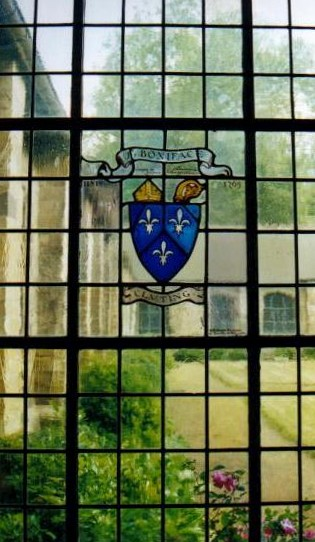
18th-century-style leadlighting, Brussels.

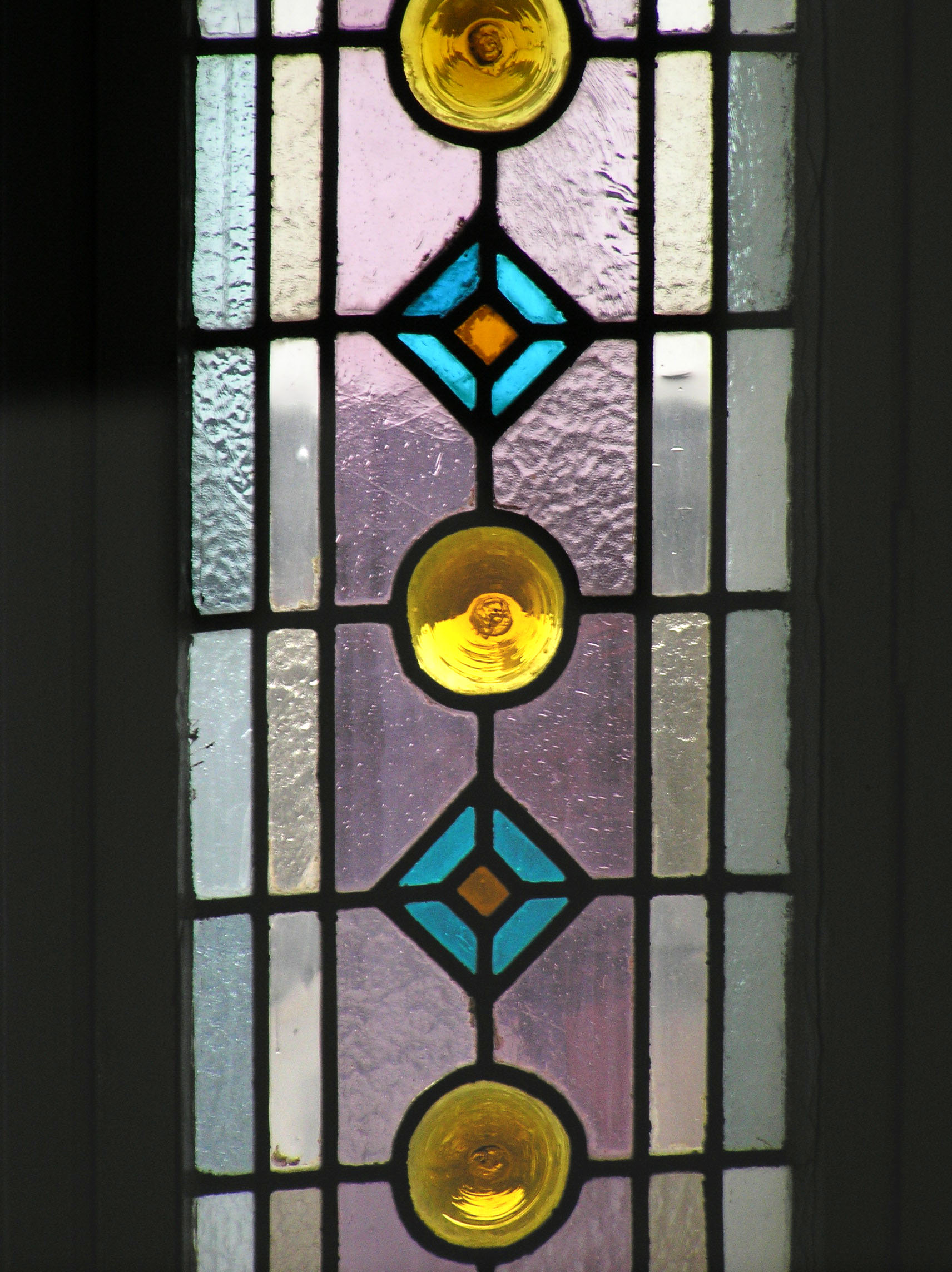
19th century domestic leadlight with cathedral glass and bull's eyes.

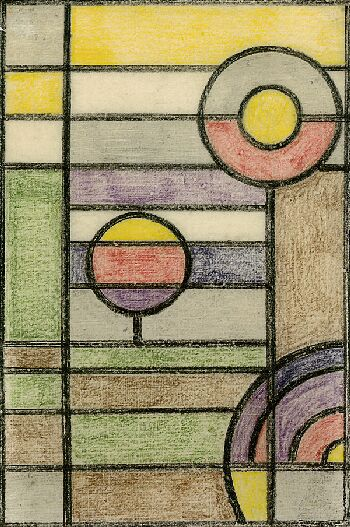
A design for a cafe window by Franz Wilhelm Seiwert, 1928.

== History ==
=== 15th–17th centuries ===
Many buildings exist that were glazed during this period, with Little Moreton Hall (1555–1559) in Cheshire, England being particularly famous for the extensive nature of its leadlighting. During this period, large sheets of glass were unavailable. Domestic windows were generally small and were made of broad glass or cylinder glass before crown glass was first made in England in 1678. Broad glass is usually around 1.5 to 2 mm thick and uneven, often with scars and marks on the surface where it has been "ironed" flat, and often has a greenish tint. Later windows often used crown glass, which has a much better surface quality and shows slight concentric ripples that form as the disk is spun. Old windows often contain a mixture of several types of glass, as they will have been re-leaded about every 100 years, with the replacement of some of the quarries. The irregular glinting surface of diamond-pane windows is a distinctive feature of old European houses. The diaper shape of the panes gave greater stability than square-cut straight-set panes, and it is accordingly more common. It was also convenient to cut diamond-shaped panes from a single "crown" of glass with less waste than that caused by cutting square panes. Square panes are most often found in the grander or later buildings, and sometimes only on ground floor windows.

In grander houses, the windows often contain small painted panes or stained glass panels containing heraldic emblems and coats of arms. Some European churches also retain diaper glass of this period: some, like York Minster, with painted and fired quarries.

During the 19th and early 20th, century a great number of important medieval houses were restored and had their windows returned to an earlier style of glazing. The glazing of the western range of Haddon Hall, Derbyshire, is particularly effective, as each pane is set at a different angle to those adjacent, creating jewel-like facets when seen from the exterior.

=== Late 17th–18th centuries ===
With the development of sash windows, leadlighting became much less common in the domestic setting, giving way to larger panes of glass set into wooden frames. Doors were often surmounted by decorative fanlights in which the panes of glass might be supported by lead, but wood was also commonly used as the support for the glass in fanlights. Casement windows and fixed windows continued to employ leadlight, often with larger panes of rectangular rather than diamond shape. Large windows set in public buildings and churches of this period also employed rectangular panes of leadlight supported by armatures, emphasizing the classical design of the windows. Heraldic motifs in stained glass were often set into the windows.

=== 19th century ===
By 1840 there was a growing fashion for the Medieval. The Gothic Revival brought about a new popularity for diamond-pane windows, which were initially found in homes of the wealthy. Soon, the fashion for leadlight windows spread, promoted by the Arts and Crafts Movement. Leadlight became a commonplace feature of houses, generally to be found in or around the front door.

The style might be medievalising, formal classical motifs, or Arts and Crafts designs which often included among the motifs lilies, tulips, and sunflowers. In the late Victorian period, it was common for leadlight windows in wealthier homes to contain small rondels painted in grisaille (grey) depicting birds or fruit and flowers representing the seasons.

Also during this period, many churches and public buildings were constructed in Revival styles. Many public buildings, such as town halls, public libraries, museums and hospitals, had their public spaces glazed with pale-coloured leadlight, creating a pleasant ambience in areas where good lighting was required, but a view was not.

At this time, a great number of new churches were also constructed, particularly in England, the United States, countries of the British Commonwealth, and Japan. Many of these churches were initially glazed with leadlight, often in pastel cathedral glass or Powell's cast quarries with impressed designs. Although the windows were frequently replaced later with pictorial stained glass, many such windows remain, particularly in less visible locations such as organ lofts and ringing chambers. In Sydney, the Anglican Church of St. Philip's, Church Hill retains an intact set of Powell's impressed quarries.

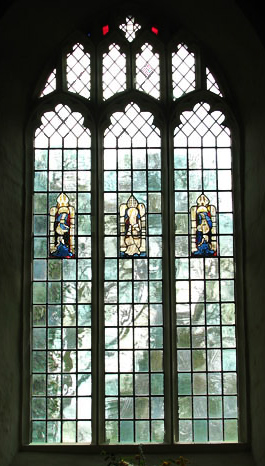
A leadlight window (18th-century-style) set with salvaged remnants of ancient stained glass, England.

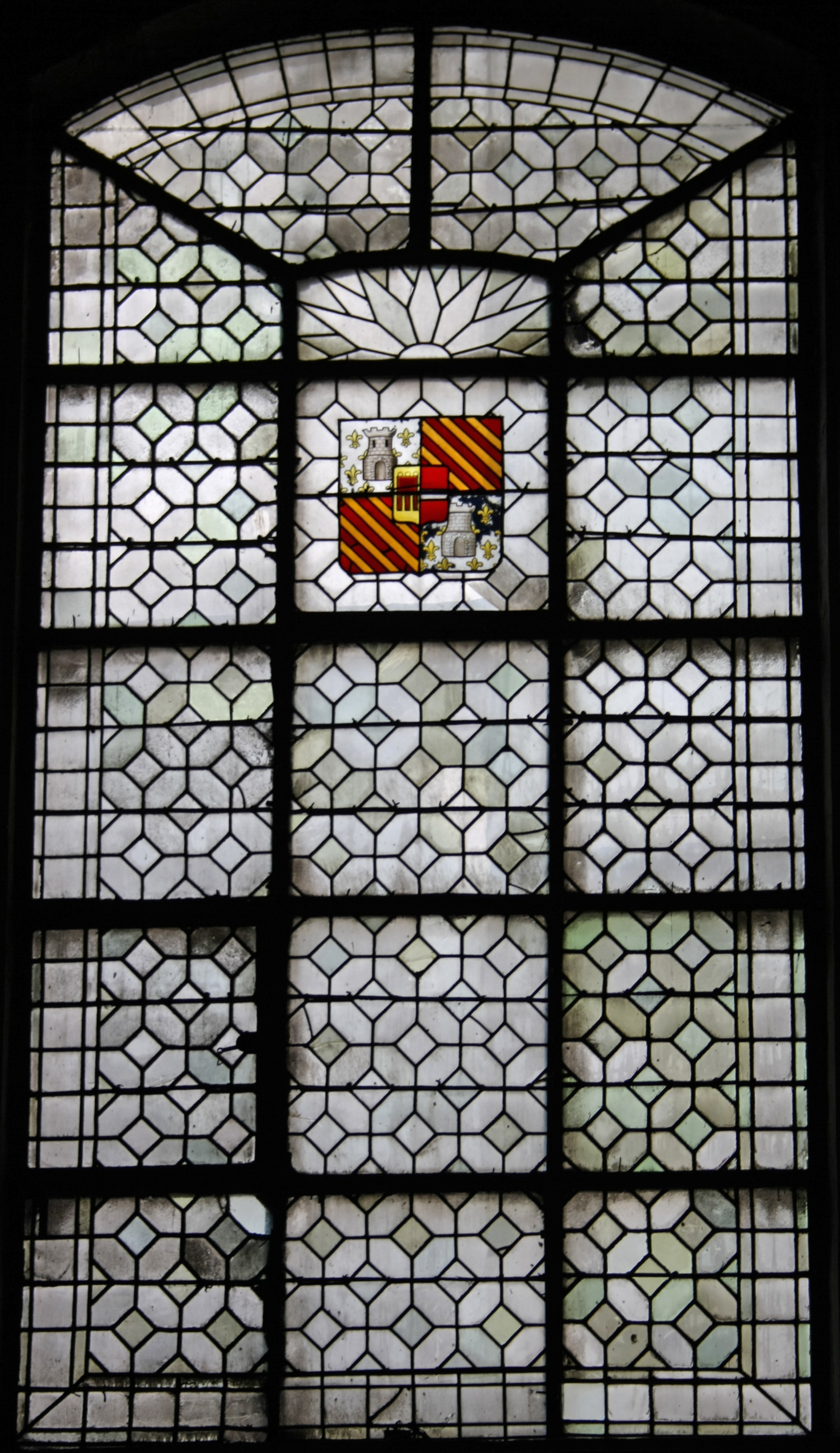
A leadlight window set with an heraldic shield (1840s) in the church of St. Paul and St. Louis, Paris

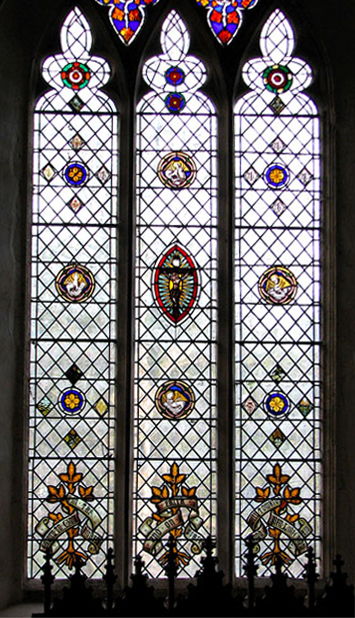
A 19th-century leadlight church window set with small stained glass roundels with symbolic motifs, England.

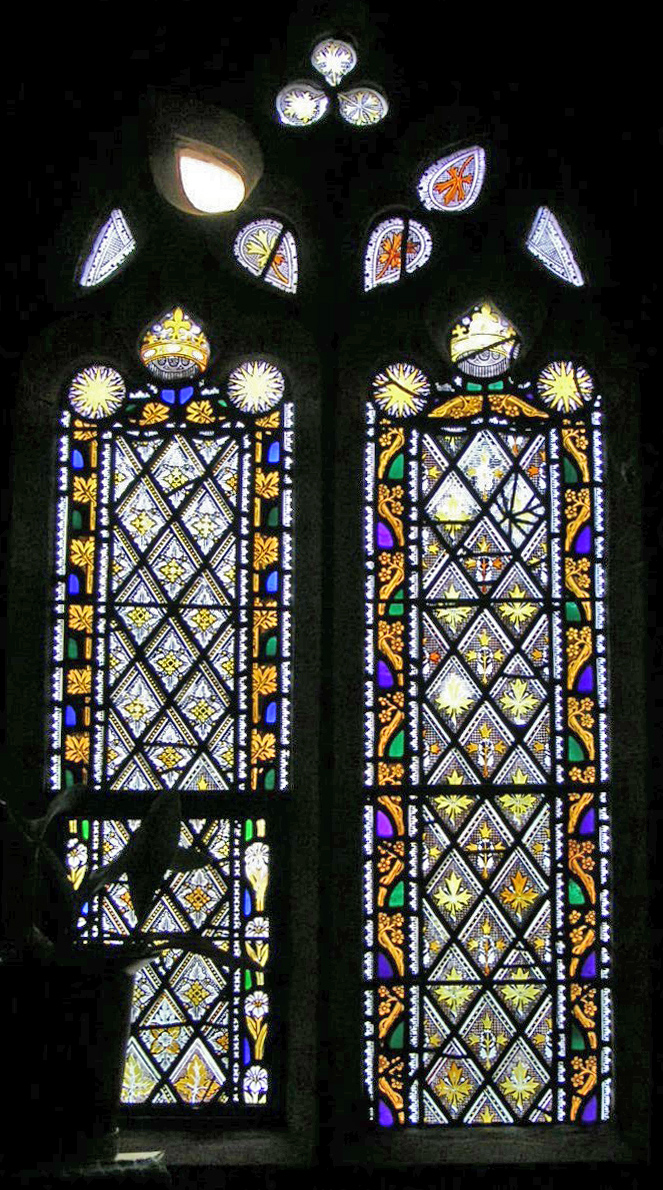
Mid-19th-century window of Powell's impressed and silver-stained quarries, Sydney

=== 20th century ===
In domestic architecture, prior to World War I, the front entrance remained the focus for decorative leadlighting. It was also commonly used for stairwell windows, but was uncommon in other locations where large panes of glass were valued over small ones. The Art Nouveau or Secessionist styles dominated the design, leading to the incorporation of many long, curved sections of glass that were never previously a feature of leadlight windows. As in the 19th century, there was much application of leadlighting to the foyers and public spaces of public buildings. Many late 19th and early 20th century commercial buildings make extensive use of leadlighting, particularly in shopping arcades and tea rooms. Leadlighting in translucent glass was also used extensively for internal doors of public and commercial buildings, theatres, and other such venues, because it enabled people approaching the door from opposite sides to be visible to each other.

After World War I, the focus on the decoration of the front entrance became less common in domestic architecture, and the front windows became the location of leadlighting. Many houses of the 1920s and 30s have Mock Tudor elements, including gables decorated with pseudo half-timbering and leadlight casement windows in diamond panes at the front of the house. This architectural style is commonly found in public houses of the time, and also in school buildings. With the "bungalow" style of architecture becoming increasingly popular, sash windows were also often made with leadlighting and incorporated sections of glass very much larger than in traditional diapered windows. This trend continued until World War II, with the style evolving from Art Nouveau to Art Deco, which both employed a great variety of glass, including cathedral glass and opalescent glass, as well as bevelled glass. From 1940 until about 1980 domestic leadlighting was less common.

The designs varied greatly in character and quality in this period, with the famous designers Louis Comfort Tiffany, Alphonse Mucha, and Charles Rennie Mackintosh all having much influence on leadlighting, both commercial and domestic. Many of the larger-scale works in leadlight of this period, particularly in public and commercial venues, are artistic masterpieces.

The medium responded to local character and local events. A typical example is the effect of the unification of the Australian states through Federation in 1901, which brought a profusion of designs based on Australian flora and fauna to local leadlight production. Another notable example is the windows of the booking hall of Sydney's Central Railway Station (seen below).

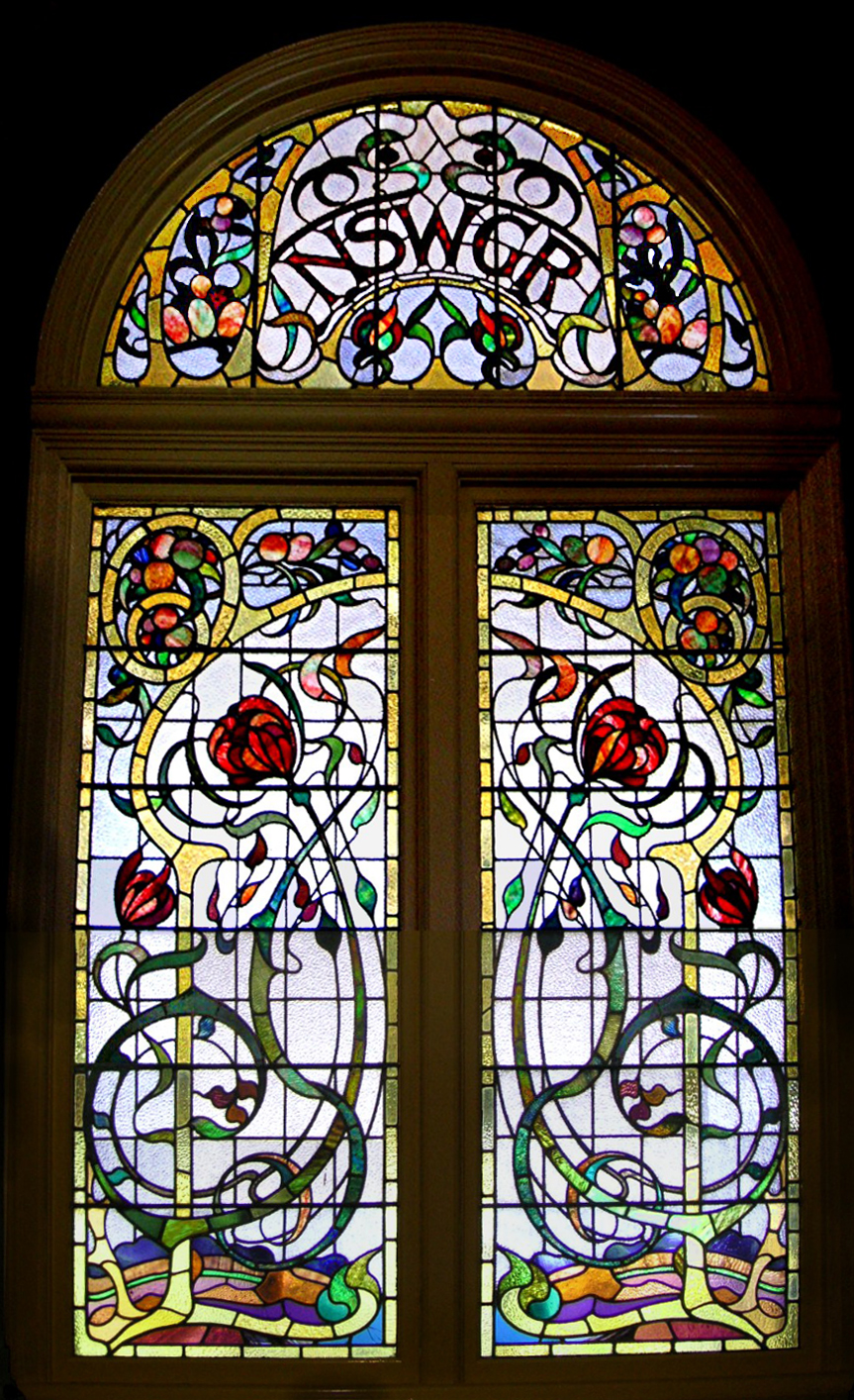
One of a series of large windows of Art Nouveau design in Favrile and cathedral glass, with the state's floral emblem, the waratah, Sydney Central Station, NSW, Australia. Despite the complexity, the execution was classed as "leadlighting".

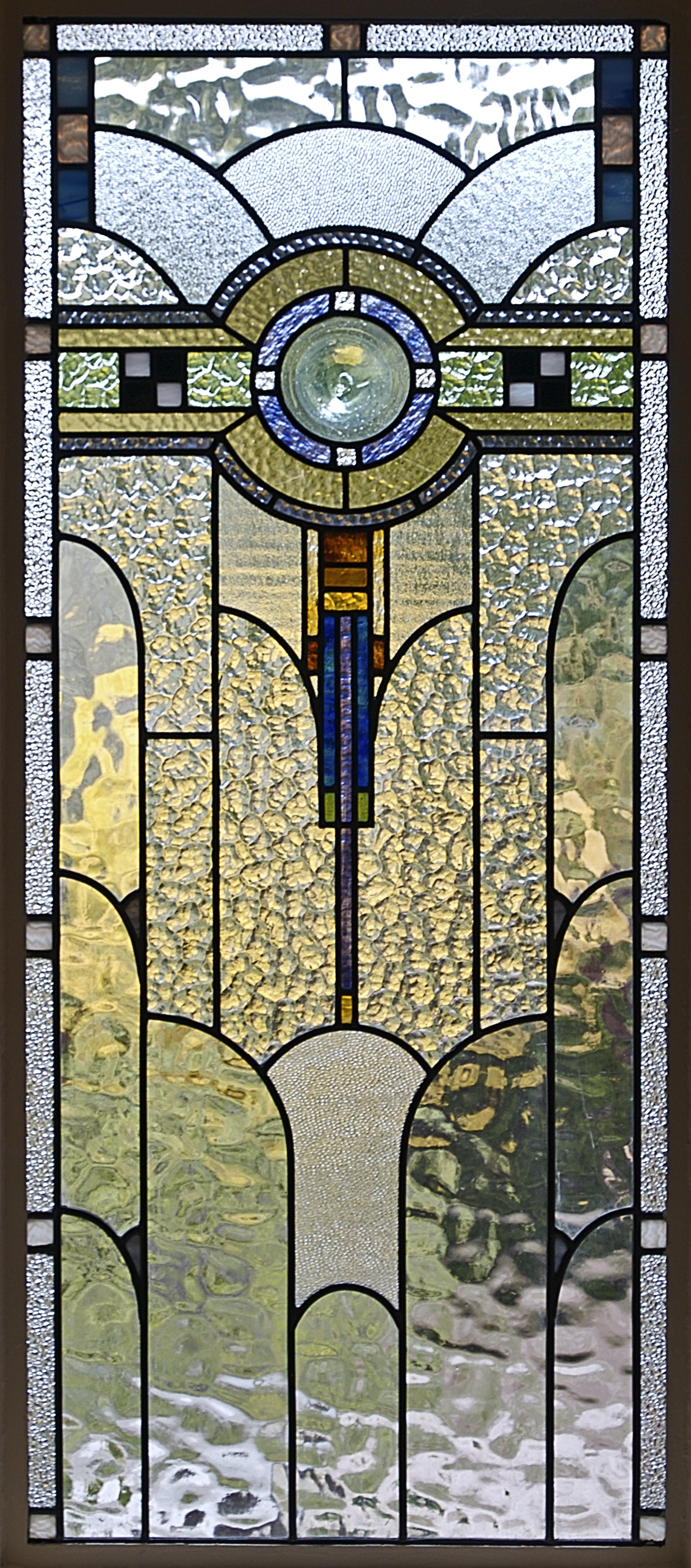
An Art Deco domestic casement window, Melbourne, Australia, shows a wide variety of textured glass with some streaky glass in muted colours.

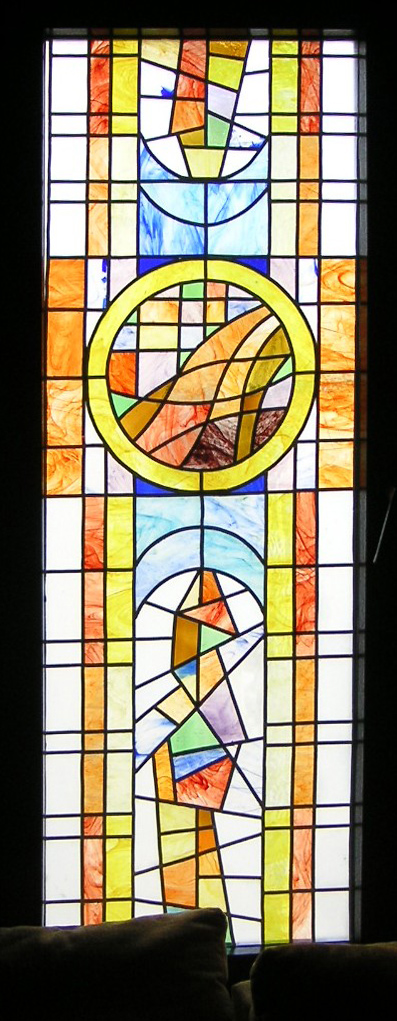
This abstract design in a hotel in Romania demonstrates the blurring of the definitions of leadlight and stained glass windows in the 20th century.

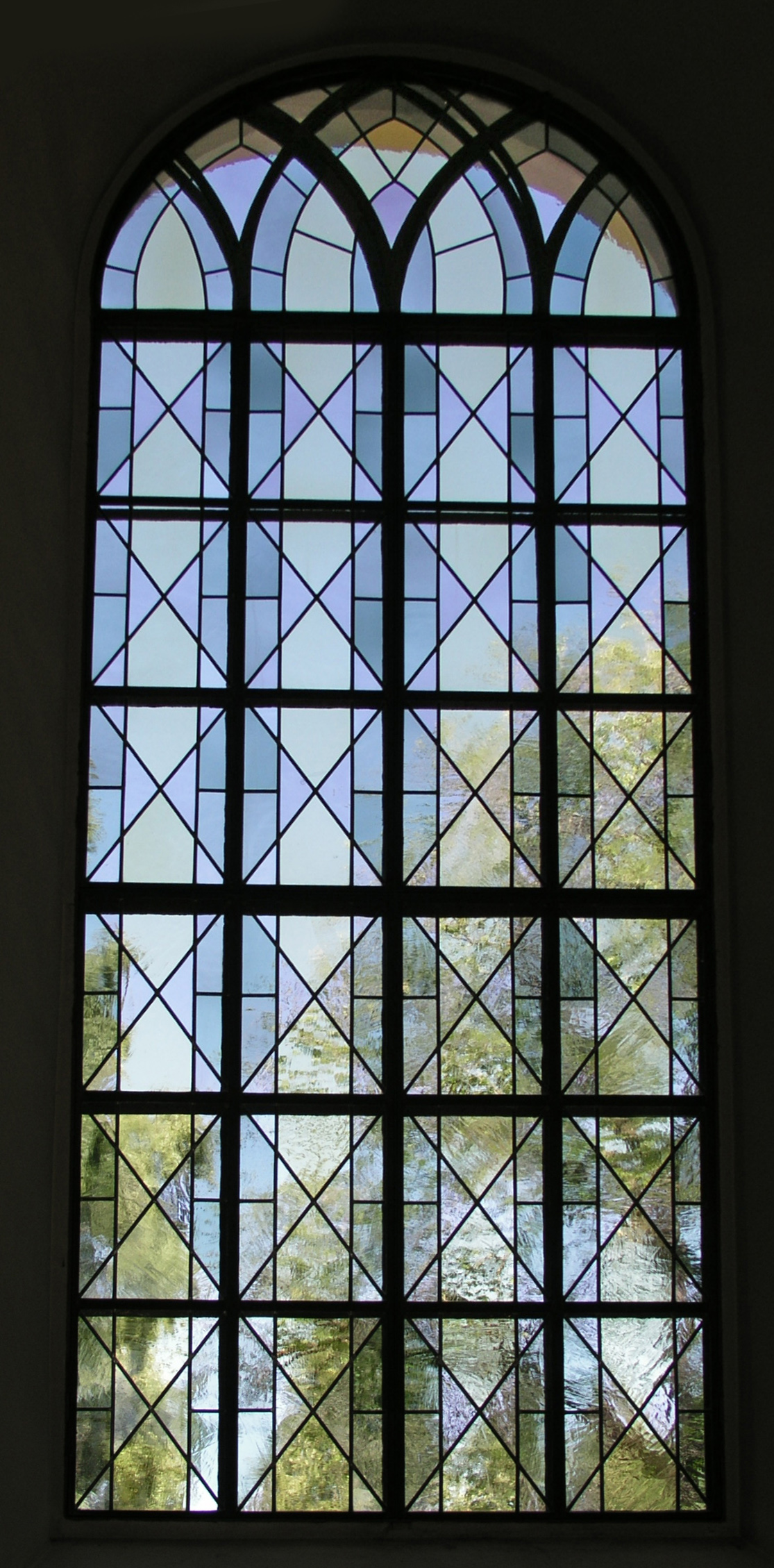
Post-Modern leadlighting, combining traditional diamond pane form with the squareness of an iron armature and the arch of a church window in a design of great precision and subtlety. Karlstad Cathedral, Sweden.

=== Late 20th century ===
The late 20th century has seen a revival of the craft, which is now taught in technical colleges and utilized by many artists. Many leadlight artists employ simple pictorial forms that can be achieved without recourse to painting and firing. Recent formalised motifs have included butterflies, yachts on the ocean, and a wide range of flora.

Whereas in the early 20th century the product of a small leadlighting studio generally reflected trends in modern architecture and was produced with great competence by professional craftsmen fully trained through apprenticeship, modern leadighting is increasingly the province of amateurs. The resultant product often demonstrates a lack of formal design training on behalf of the craftsperson, and a lack of awareness of stylistic trends. However, the products of late 20th and 21st century leadlighting continue to display a mastery of the traditional technical skills, an awareness of design trends, and creative artistry.

=== Artificial leadlight ===
A commercially produced product, often referred to as "stained glass" or "leadlight", is made of single sheets of glass with self-adhesive lead placed on both sides to replicate lead cames, and either a film or stain placed on the surface to replicate coloured glass. This product has wide domestic application and may be mistaken for genuine stained glass or leadlight. Another method now available is the use of coloured resins that are floated onto the glass, with the different colours divided by a line of resin that emulates the lead came used in traditional pieces.

== Notable artists ==
- William Morris
- Daniel Cottier
- Louis Comfort Tiffany
- Charles Rennie MacIntosh
- Frank Lloyd Wright – this American architect was also a proponent and designer of stained glass
- Arthur Clarke - Head artist of Stained glass and Leadlight windows for Barnett Bros of East Perth.

== Notable suburbs ==
Subiaco, Western Australia contains one of the most well preserved collections in the world, because Subiaco's early residents were predominantly working class and, as they moved into middle class prosperity, they expressed their wealth through home adornment such as leadlights, many with Flora and Fauna motifs.

== Notable historic homes ==
An example is Fairview Historic Home of Subiaco. Built for Scottish ice engineer John Kennedy, it was owned for 40 years by heritage activist Polly Willis. Hall and entry leadlights of bearded iris and roses are attributed to Arthur Clarke of Barnett Bros East Perth.

== Notable studios ==
Barnett Bros in East Perth was one of the most prolific studios, with Arthur Clarke as their head designer.
