= Moreton cum Alcumlow =

Civil parish in Cheshire, England

Coordinates: 53.133°N 2.236°W

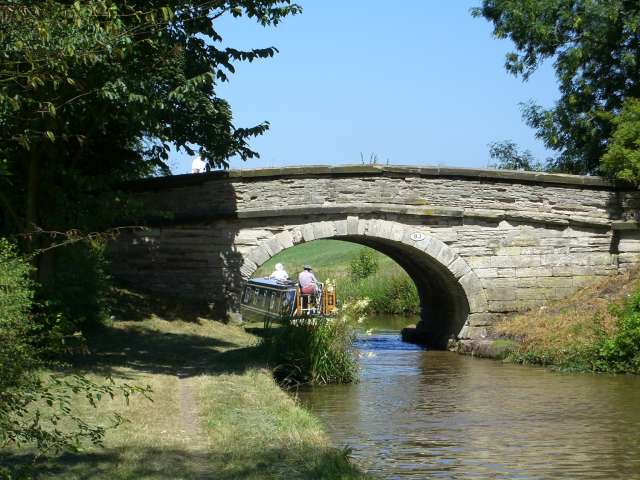
- Bridge 83, Macclesfield Canal

- Location within Cheshire
- Population: 155 (Parish, 2021)
- OS grid reference: SJ841596
- Civil parish: Moreton cum Alcumlow
- Unitary authority: Cheshire East
- Ceremonial county: Cheshire
- Region: North West
- Country: England
- Sovereign state: United Kingdom
- Post town: CONGLETON
- Postcode district: CW12
- Dialling code: 01260
- Police: Cheshire
- Fire: Cheshire
- Ambulance: North West
- UK Parliament: Congleton

Moreton cum Alcumlow is a small civil parish in Cheshire East, Cheshire, England. In the 2021 census it had a population of 155. The main settlement in the parish is the small village of Ackers Crossing. The parish also includes Alcumlow Hall and Great Moreton Hall. (Little Moreton Hall is in the adjacent civil parish of Odd Rode.)

== Governance ==
There are two tiers of local government covering Moreton cum Alcumlow, at parish and unitary authority level: Newbold Astbury cum Moreton Parish Council, and Cheshire East Council. The parish council is a grouped parish council, also covering the neighbouring parish of Newbold Astbury.

=== Administrative history ===
Moreton cum Alcumlow was historically one of twelve townships within the ancient parish of Astbury, and formed part of the Northwich hundred of Cheshire. From the 17th century onwards, parishes were gradually given various civil functions under the poor laws, in addition to their original ecclesiastical functions. In some cases, including Astbury, the civil functions were exercised by each township separately rather than the parish as a whole. In 1866, the legal definition of 'parish' was changed to be the areas used for administering the poor laws, and so Moreton cum Alcumlow became a civil parish.

The parish was too small to have a parish council when they were established in 1894, so had a parish meeting instead. It was placed under a grouped parish council with neighbouring Newbold Astbury in 1975.

== See also ==
- Listed buildings in Moreton cum Alcumlow
