= Listed buildings in Moreton cum Alcumlow =

Moreton cum Alcumlow is a civil parish in Cheshire East, England, United Kingdom. It contains 13 buildings that are recorded in the National Heritage List for England as designated listed buildings. Of these, one is listed at Grade II*, the middle grade, and the others are at Grade II. The major building in the parish is Great Moreton Hall; this and a number of structures associated with it are listed. The Macclesfield Canal runs through the parish, and four bridges crossing it are listed. Apart from the estate of Great Moreton Hall, the parish is rural, and two farmhouses are also listed.

== Key ==
Grade	Criteria
II*	Particularly important buildings of more than special interest
II	Buildings of national importance and special interest

== Buildings ==
Name and location	Photograph	Date	Notes	Grade
Lodge Farmhouse; 53.12473°N 2.21274°W	—	1653	The farmhouse is built in rendered sandstone. It is in two storeys with an attic, and has an entrance front of two bays. On the right are a 20th-century porch and a 19th-century wing. The windows are mullioned, and contain casements. Inside the farmhouse is a blocked inglenook.	II
Boathouse; 53.13516°N 2.24392°W	—	18th century	This originated as a brick farm building, and was converted into a boathouse when the lake was created in the 19th century. It is in two storeys with an attic. The lake front has a stone lower floor containing an archway. The upper part is timber-framed and jettied with decorative bargeboards. Behind is part of the original brick building with a slate roof. Other features include a brick tower and a canted bay window.	II
Bridge No. 82; 53.13453°N 2.22541°W	—	c. 1827	An accommodation bridge crossing the Macclesfield Canal, for which the engineer was William Crosley. It is built in sandstone and consists of a single horseshoe arch with voussoirs, keystones, and parapets. There are curved retaining walls ending in square piers.	II
Bridge No. 83; 53.13213°N 2.22725°W		c. 1827	The bridge carries Wharf Lane across the Macclesfield Canal, for which the engineer was William Crosley. It is built in sandstone and consists of a single horseshoe arch with voussoirs, keystones, and parapets. There are curved retaining walls ending in square piers.	II
Bridge No. 84; 53.13049°N 2.22856°W		c. 1827	An accommodation bridge crossing the Macclesfield Canal, for which the engineer was William Crosley. It is built in sandstone and consists of a single horseshoe arch with voussoirs, keystones, and parapets. There are curved retaining walls ending in square piers.	II
Bridge No. 85; 53.12789°N 2.23074°W	—	c. 1827	The bridge carries New Road across the Macclesfield Canal, for which the engineer was William Crosley. It is built in sandstone and consists of a single horseshoe arch with voussoirs, keystones, and parapets. There are curved retaining walls ending in square piers.	II
Great Moreton Hall; 53.13244°N 2.24119°W		1841–43	A castellated country house in Gothic style designed by Edward Blore. It is built in sandstone with slate roofs. The main part of the house is in two storeys, flanked by towers of three and four storeys, and has a front of six bays. To the left is a service range. At the front of the house is a porte-cochère.	II*
Icehouse tower, Great Moreton Hall; 53.13239°N 2.23990°W	—	1841–43	The icehouse tower was designed by Edward Blore and is built in sandstone. It is hexagonal and in three storeys. In the lowest stage is a two-light window, with lancets in the upper stages. Inside is a brick tunnel vaulted corridor leading to a circular domed chamber.	II
Summerhouse and wall, Great Moreton Hall; 53.13148°N 2.24207°W	—	1841–43	The summerhouse was designed by Edward Blore. It is built in sandstone, is octagonal in shape, is in two storeys, and has a castellated parapet. The summerhouse is linked to a stone wall carrying a raised walkway. There are two doors in the upper storey linking to the walkway, and a door in the lower storey leading into the garden. The upper storey also contains lancet windows.	II
West Lodge, Great Moreton Hall; 53.13659°N 2.25346°W		c. 1841–43	The gate lodge, designed by Edward Blore, is built in sandstone with a roof of cement tiles. It is in a single storey, and has a T-shaped plan. The entrance front has a gabled bay containing a bay window, above which is a brattished parapet. In the gable is a niche containing a heraldic shield. The gate piers at the entrance to the drive are included in the listing.	II
Garden wall and outbuildings, Great Moreton Hall; 53.13306°N 2.23861°W	—	Mid-19th century	The garden wall is in brick, surrounds the former kitchen garden, and is attached to outbuildings. At the northwest corner is Fern House, a restored former greenhouse. Against the north face of the north wall is another outbuilding, in brick with a tiled roof, now stretching for 13 bays. Two of these bays form the Mushroom House, which contains 36 arched recesses for mushroom beds.	II
East Lodge, Great Moreton Hall; 53.13366°N 2.23300°W		1858	The gate lodge is built in sandstone with a tiled roof. It is in two storeys with wings of a single storey, and contains Tudor details. On the drive front is a semi-octagonal bay window containing casements. At the top of each face is a steep gable with decorative bargeboards. The central gable contains a shield with a coat of arms and the date.	II
Home Farmhouse; 53.13516°N 2.23355°W	—	1871	The farmhouse is built in concrete with ashlar dressings and a tiled roof in two storeys. The entrance front has a projecting right gabled bay containing a two-storey bay window. In the house are cross-windows and casements with lattice glazing.	II

== See also ==
- Listed buildings in Biddulph, Staffordshire
- Listed buildings in Kidsgrove, Staffordshire
- Listed buildings in Newbold Astbury
- Listed buildings in Odd Rode
- Listed buildings in Smallwood
