= Lime-ash floor =

Lime-ash floors were an economic form of floor construction from the 15th century to the 19th century, for upper floors in parts of England where limestone or chalk were easily available. They were strong, flexible, and offered good heat and sound insulation.

== History ==
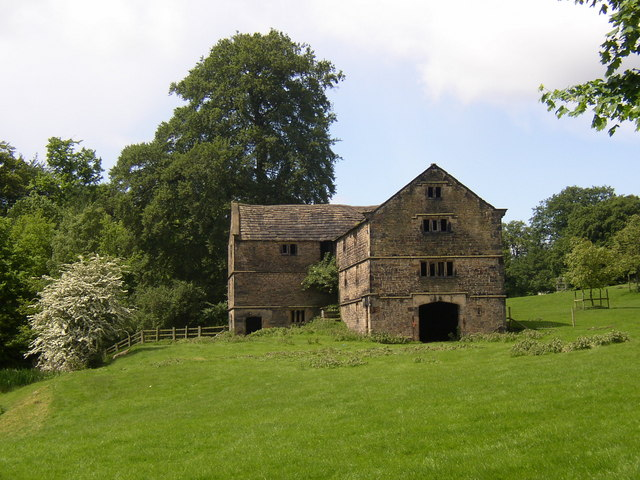
A malthouse in Yorkshire, England, that uses lime-ash floors

Lime-ash is the residue found at the bottom of a wood-fired lime kiln, consisting of waste lime and wood ash. These kilns became common in the early 15th century and continued to be used until newer technology replaced them in the late 19th century. Lime-ash could also be made in coal-fired kilns. In areas where gypsum was common they were known as plaster floors. Lime ash was used on the upper floors of yeomen's houses and in great houses such as Hardwick Hall in Derbyshire, where the upper surface would be buffed to a fine finish using a mixture of egg-white, curdled milk and fish-gelatine. The underside could be left bare or smoothed with a lime-plaster. Alternatively the floor joist could be concealed with a conventional lath and plaster ceiling.

Isaac Ware in his A Complete Body of Architecture (1756) remarks on "the beauty of floors of plaster mixed with other ingredients", comparing them with those of granite.

== Construction ==
A lime-ash floor typically occurs on the upper floors of a building. One can expect to find construction beams lying the length of the building with flooring joists being placed across at intervals of about 400 mm (16 in). A bed of reeds (or similar grasses) is placed on the joists making a tight thatch. They are secured by placing oak laths over them and nailing these to the joists. A 50 mm slurry of lime-ash composition is poured over the bedding material which supports it until the lime-ash has dried out. The reed bed acts as shuttering and laths add to the rigidity of the floor. However laths that are too tightly fixed to the joists hinder the movement the floor must have to cope with settlement and the structural changes during its lifetime which can be counted in centuries.

The lime-ash composition varies according to the materials locally available:

- Lime – acts as a binder and contains particles of raw limestone and over burnt lime.
- Fuel ash – this pozzolanic material binds its constituent Si(OH)_{4} with the Ca² ions in a pozzolanic reaction. It contains burnt wood or coal.
- Gypsum, to help with set
- Clay with fragments of broken brick and tile, another pozzolanic material
- Silica or sand, which acts as an aggregate
- Other debris – vegetable or animal and bubbles of air.

Nigel and Mary Kerr in Lincolnshire Life, November 1987, write: "A traditional mix used in Nottinghamshire, Northamptonshire and south Lincolnshire was: 'One third lime, one third well sifted coal ashes and one third loamy clay and horse dung from grasses'". They add that ox blood and horse hair were sometimes included.

=== Problems occurring ===
After long use the surface can start to break up: this can be ignored, or a further screed of lime-ash composition can be laid over the original floor. This was often done in the past but does increase the weight of the structure. Damp can cause fungi to rot the bedding material, or insects to gnaw away the laths and indeed the joists, taking with it the floor. Knocking through service ducts without due care can destroy the floor, as can overloading due to change of use or addition of partition walls.

=== Laying a new floor ===
Lime-ash is generally no longer available, so repairs and reconstruction are usually done using a mixture of lime putty, coal ash, Gypsum (Class A hemi hydrate fine casting plaster), unburnt loamy clay and burnt crushed tile. To this are added retardants such as keratin (natural) or sodium citrate (manufactured). The bedding material is repaired with water reed 5 feet (1,500 mm), or combed winter wheat which is the strongest form of straw, and chestnut laths which can be obtained in 4 feet (1,200 mm) lengths.

== Geographical variations ==
They can be found principally in Derbyshire, Cheshire, Shropshire, Herefordshire and the Welsh borders, Staffordshire, Leicestershire, Worcestershire and Warwickshire; Lincolnshire, Nottinghamshire and many parts of Yorkshire. Some floors are made almost entirely of gypsum, particularly around Newark – plaster floors would be a better description.

=== Buildings ===
- Little Morton Hall, Cheshire
- Barlborough Old Hall, Derbyshire
- Hardwick Hall, Derbyshire
- Newton's house at Woolsthorpe, Lincolnshire
- Gainsborough Old Hall

== See also ==
- Cob (material)
- Rammed earth
- Straw-bale construction

== Bibliography ==
- Hartley, Philip (1996), "Introduction to the repair of Lime-ash and Plaster Floors", SPAB News, 17 (4), London E1 6DY: Society for the Protection of Ancient Buildings
- Vernon, Biff (2007), Lime ash floors, archived from the original on 29 March 2013
