= Complete English Gardener =

1670 guide by Leonard Meager

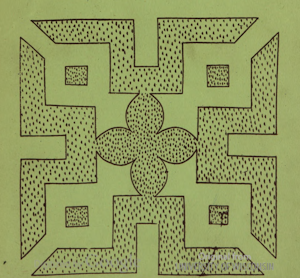
An illustration of a knot garden layout from the book

The Complete English Gardener is a practical guide to gardening first published in 1670 by the English author Leonard Meager. The original title is The English Gardener, or, A Sure Guide to Young Planters and Gardeners: in Three Parts.

== Historical context and expanded edition ==
The Complete English Gardener was among many gardening books released after John Parkinson's Paradisi in Sole in 1629. It was very popular and went through many editions, and was republished as The Compleat English Gardener in 1704 with a supplement, The New Art of Gardening; with the Gardener's Almanack.

The book's influence extended to the American colony of Massachusetts. The book was described by author Ann Leighton as "the epitome of all the handy books on gardening which were becoming plentiful in a time when books of instruction from those purporting to be experts were greatly in vogue."

== Contents ==
The book contains a variety of gardening advice, including how to grow grapes.
