= Bibikov =

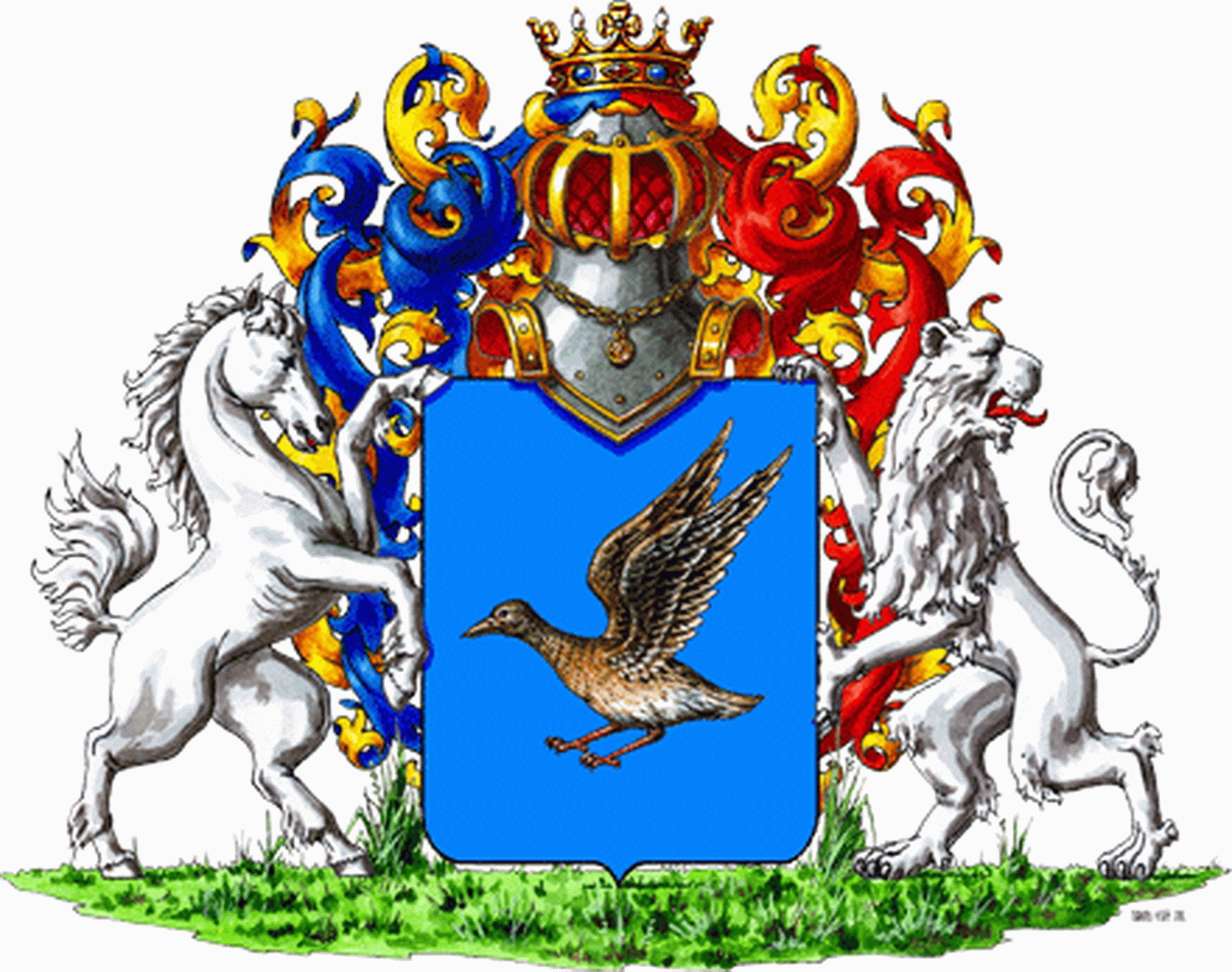
Coat of arms of Bibikov family

The Bibikov family (Russian: Бибиков) is an old and influential Russian noble family. First mentioned in the 13th century, they have descended from Boyars of Tver.

== Notable members ==
- Aleksandr Bibikov (1729–1774), Russian statesman and military officer
- Aleksandr Aleksandrovich Bibikov (1765–1822), Russian diplomat and military officer
- Nikolai Bibikov (1842–1923), Russian general; President of Warsaw from 1892 to 1906
