= Ivan Illarionovich Vorontsov =

Russian politician (1719–1786)

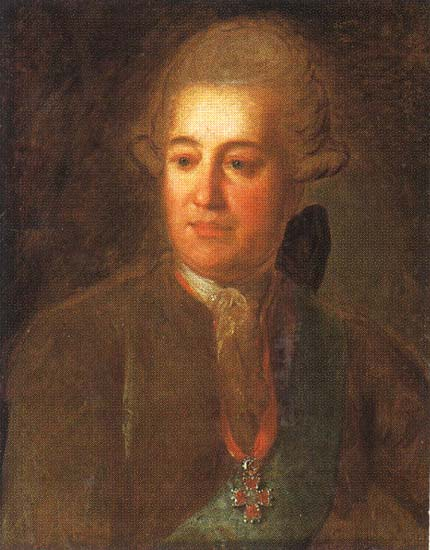
Portrait of Vorontsov by Fyodor Rokotov

Count Ivan Illarionovich Vorontsov (Russian: Иван Илларионович Воронцов; 1719-1786) was a senator, acting chamberlain, president of the Collegium of Estates in Moscow.

== Biography ==
Ivan Illarionovich Vorontsov was an uncle of Princess Yekaterina Vorontsova-Dashkova and a younger brother of General-in-chief Roman Vorontsov and Chancellor Mikhail Illarionovich Vorontsov.

His elder brother Mikhail Illarionovich Vorontsov participated in the palace coup in favor of the Empress Elizabeth in November 1741. The coup contributed to the rise of the Vorontsov brothers.

Ivan Illarionovich Vorontsov was promoted to captain of the Preobrazhensky Regiment in 1753. Two years later, he became a gentleman of the Chamber of Peter III. Then Vorontsov was elevated, at the request of the Empress Elizabeth, to the title of Count in 1760.

With the accession to the throne of Peter III of Russia, he was promoted to the rank of Lieutenant General.

Vorontsov married Maria Artemevna Volinskaya (daughter of A. Volinsky) in 1745. They had five children:

- Artemiy Ivanovich Vorontsov (1748-1813),
- Anna Ivanovna Vorontsova (1750-1807),
- Evdokia (Avdotya) Ivanovna Vorontsova (1755-1824),
- Illarion Ivanovich Vorontsov (1760-1790),
- Ulyana Ivanovna Vorontsova (1767-died in childhood).

Awards of Ivan Illarionovich Vorontsov -

- Order of Saint Anna First Class
- Order of the White Eagle

== Sources ==
- Ivan Illarionovich Vorontsov - Biography
- I.I.Vorontsov - Bio
