= Dmitry Glinka =

Dmitry Glinka (Russian: Дмитрий Глинка; also transliterated as Dmitri or Dmitriy Glinka) may refer to:

- Dmitry Glinka (diplomat) (1808–1883), Russian diplomat
- Dmitry Glinka (aviator) (1917–1979), one of the top Allied flying aces of WWII
