= Anna Artemevna Buturlina =

Russian noble (1777–1854)

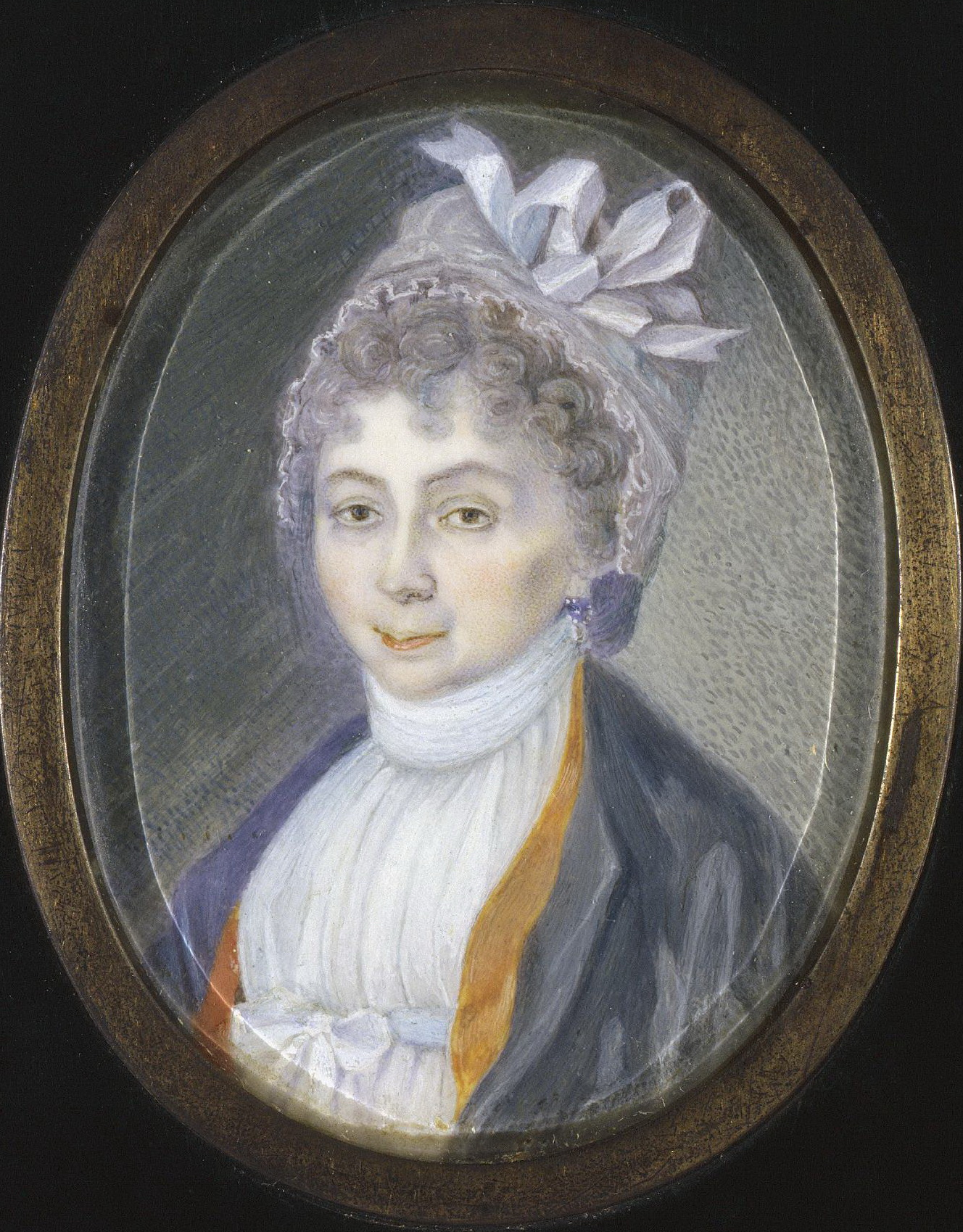
Anna Buturlina, self portrait, miniature, c. 1817. In the collections of the Hermitage Museum

Countess Anna Artemevna Buturlina (Russian: Анна Артемьевна Бутурлина), née Vorontsova (Воронцова; 1777 – 1854) was a Russian artist, noblewoman, and artist's model.

== Family and early life ==
Anna Vorontsova was born in 1777, the second daughter of Count Artemiy Ivanovich Vorontsov and his wife Countess Praskovya Feodorovna Kvashnina-Samarina. Artemiy Vorontsov was a senator, Active Privy Councillor, and owner of the Voronovo estate, as well as the godfather of poet Alexander Pushkin. She was the second cousin of M. A. Gannibal, a relation of Abram Gannibal. In 1793 Anna married her second cousin, Count Dmitry Petrovich Buturlin, a noted bibliophile and director of the Hermitage Museum. With her husband she had two sons, Pyotr and Mikhail, and three daughters, Maria, Elizaveta and Elena, as well as several other children who died in infancy.

== Artistic life ==
Contemporaries noted the mind and education of the countess. She loved to draw, was engaged in painting, particularly miniatures on ivory. She was painted by a number of the leading artists of the age, including a portrait by Fyodor Rokotov in 1793, now in the Tambov Art Gallery. A self-portrait in miniature is held in the collections of the Hermitage Museum. An early portrait by Dmitry Levitzky is held in the collections of the Russian Museum. Another portrait, by Feodosy Yanenko after an earlier work by Vladimir Borovikovsky, is held by the State Tretyakov Gallery in Moscow.

=== Gallery ===
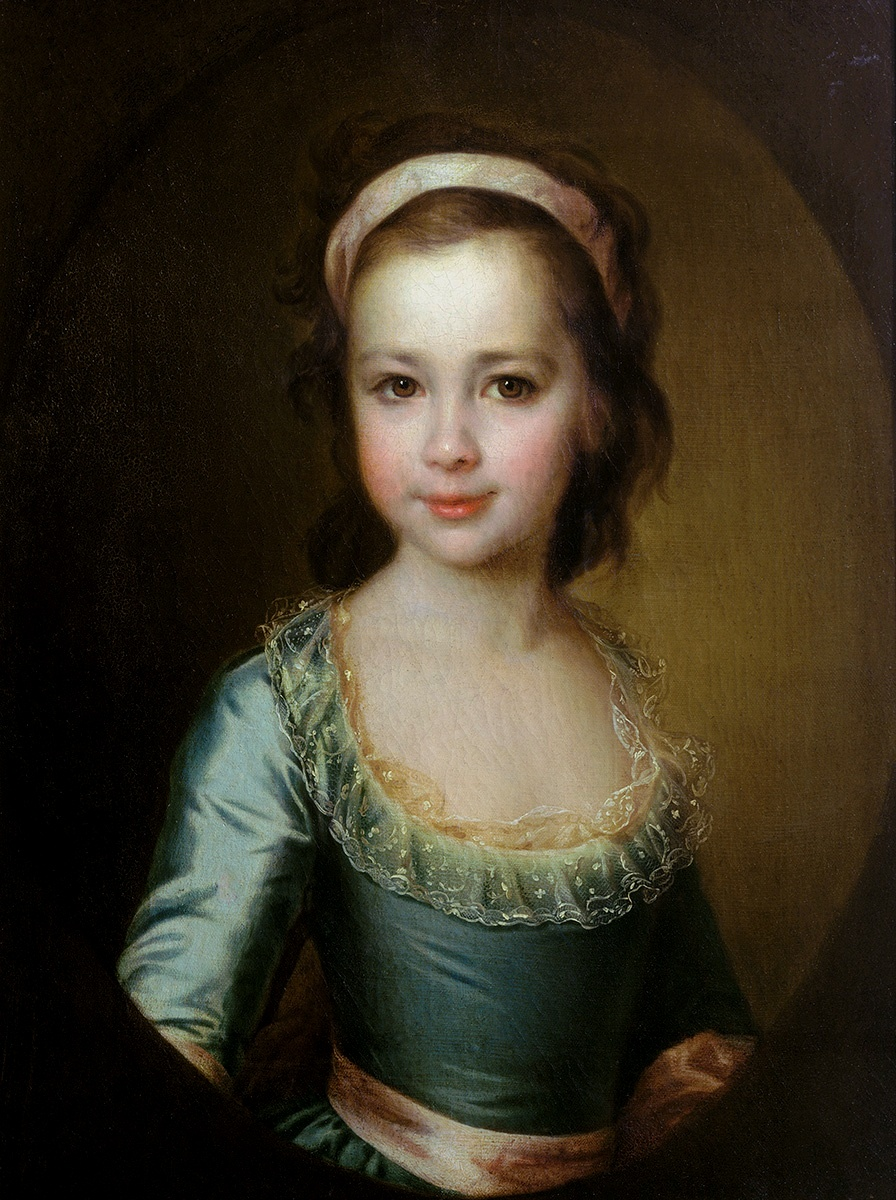
Late 1780s/early 1790s, Dmitry Levitzky

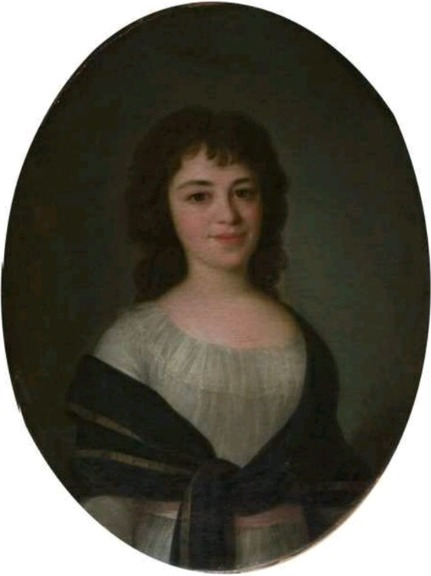
C. 1793, Fyodor Rokotov

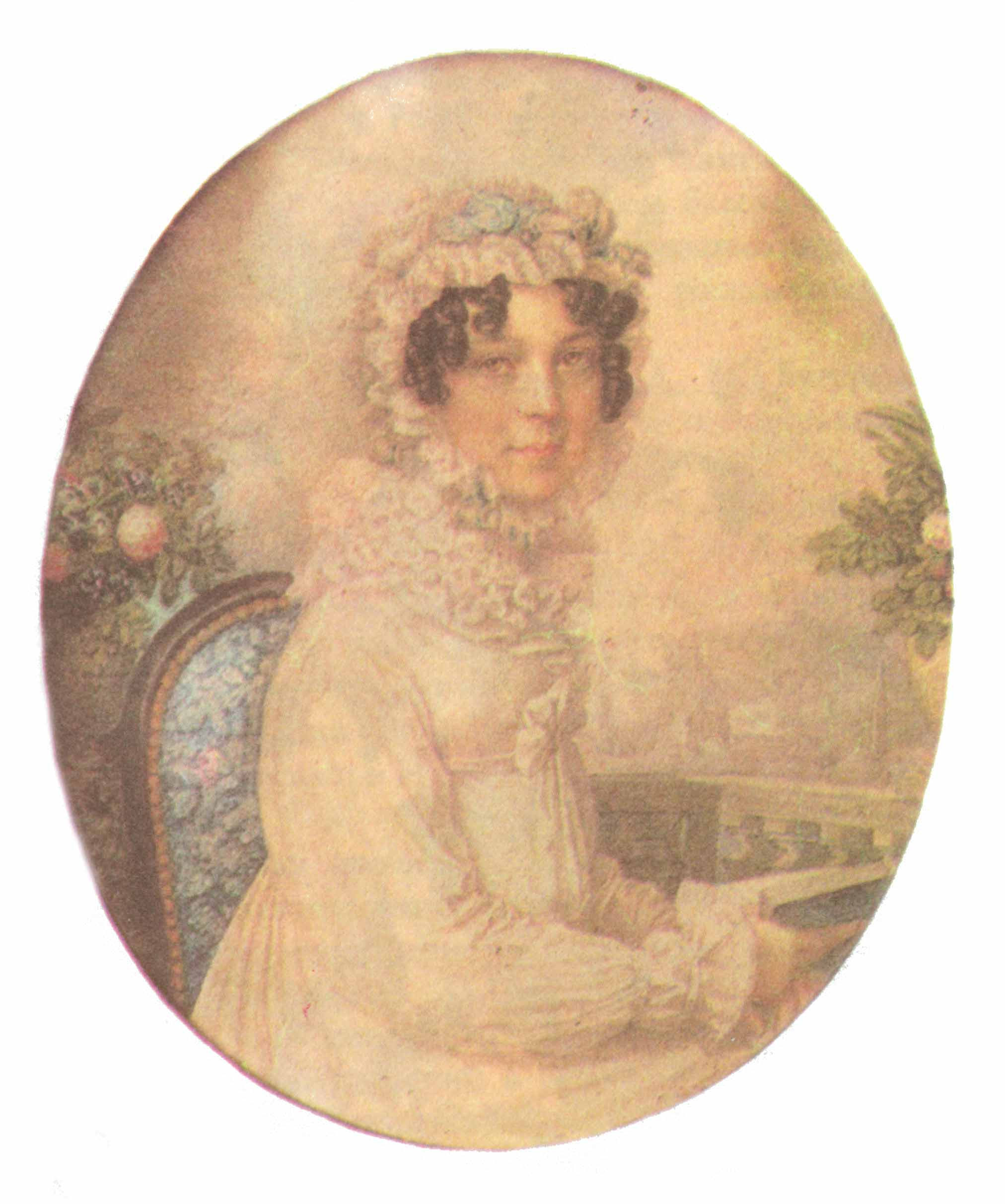
1820s, P. Carloni

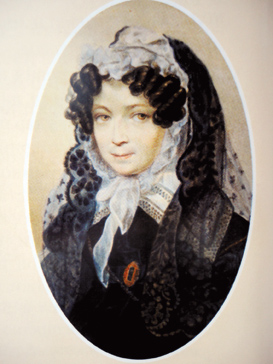
C. 1829, Anonymous

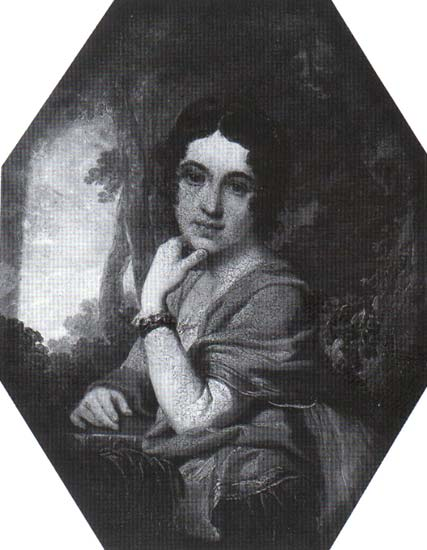
Late 1790s, Feodosy Yanenko, after Vladimir Borovikovsky

== Later life ==
In Saint Petersburg she was visited by Count Joseph de Maistre, the envoy of the King of Sardinia to the Russian court. She was also visited by Pater Jourdan of the Jesuit Order between 1813 and 1814. This association caused Countess Buturlina to consider converting to Catholicism. She moved with her family to Italy in 1817, residing mainly in Florence, and converting to Catholicism in 1825.
