= Elizabeth Trubetskaya =

Russian princess and salonist (1834–1907)

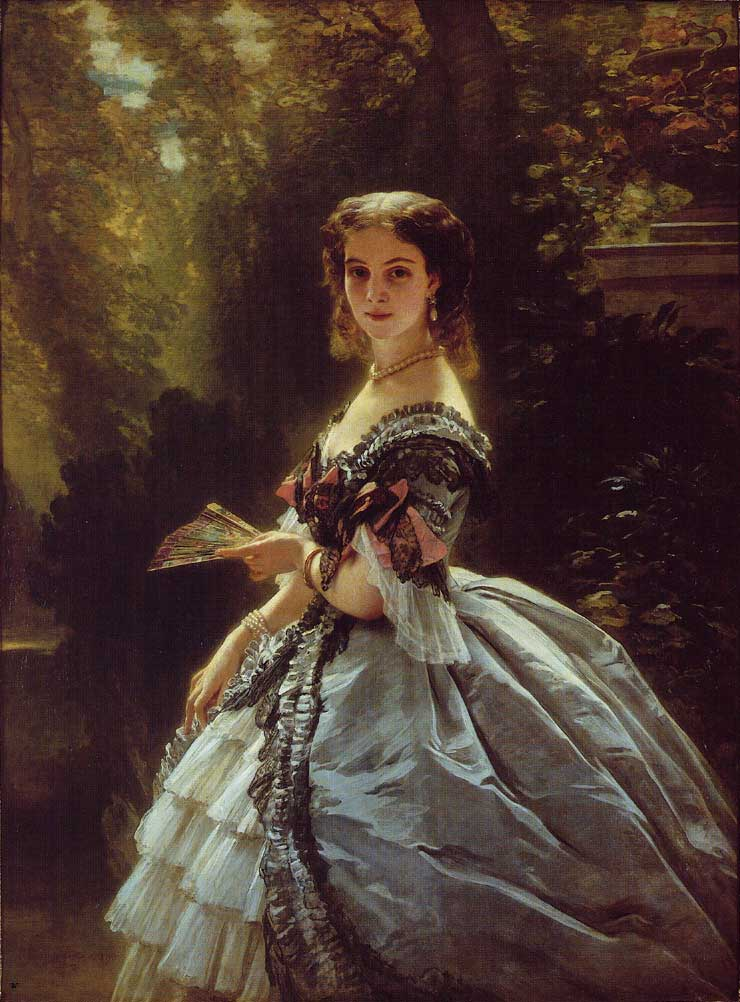
Elizaveta Esperovna Trubetskaya. Franz Xaver Winterhalter, 1859

Princess Elizabeth (Elizaveta) Esperovna Beloselskaya-Belozerskaya, later Princess Trubetskaya (Russian: Елизавета Эсперовна Трубецкая; 20 November 1834 – 30 March 1907, Saint Petersburg), was a Russian noblewoman, lady-in-waiting and a salonist.

== Early life ==
Elizaveta Esperovna, nicknamed Lise, was born on 20 November 1834 in Saint Petersburg into the ancient House of Belosselsky-Belozersky. She was the eldest daughter of Prince Esper Beloselsky-Belozersky (1802–1846) and the maid of honour Elena (Helena) Pavlovna Bibikova (1812–1888).

Her aunt, singer and composer Princess Zinaida Alexandrovna Volkonskaya Beloselskaya (1789–1862), was at one time the owner of a famous literary salon, which was visited by famous writers Mitskevich, Baratynsky, Venevitinov, DeVitte, A.S. Pushkin also visited there.

== Court life ==
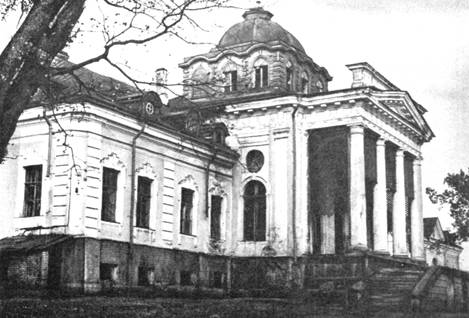
Villa Elizavetino near Gatchina

Elizaveta was the maid of honour of Grand Duchess Maria Alexandrovna. In 1859, her portrait was painted by Franz Xaver Winterhalter.

After the death of her husband, Elizaveta Esperovna began to spend more time abroad, lived in France, where she kept a political salon. She hosted a famous literary salon in Paris during the Second Empire, and played a crucial part as a mediator when France and Russia reestablished their diplomatic contacts in the 1870s. Her salon was attended by many famous politicians: Prince Kochubey, Ivan Durnovo and others. The princess was in correspondence with many political figures of the time: Francois Guizot, 3rd Viscount Palmerston, Adolphe Thiers and Prince Alexander Gorchakov.

=== Elizavetino estate ===
Lise was the owner of the Elizavetino summer estate from 1852 in the Saint Petersburg province, the main building was designed by architect Harald Julius von Bosse in 1874, and a collector of material about the Trubetskoy family. The family grave was situated in Vladimir Church in Elizavetino, where she was buried alongside her husband and children.

== Personal life ==
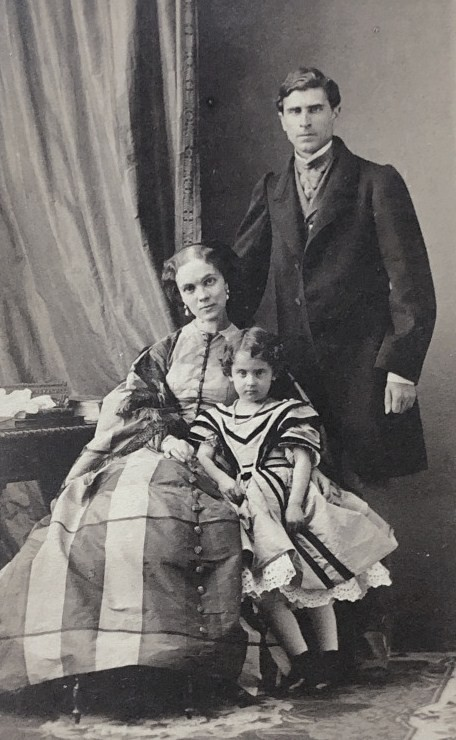
Elizaveta Esperovna Trubetskaya, husband Pyotr Nikitich Trubetskoy and daughter Elena, by André-Adolphe-Eugène Disdéri, 1859.

In 1851, she married Prince Pyotr Nikitich Trubetskoy (1826-1880), True State Councillor and Saint Petersburg district leader of the nobility. Together, they were the parents of:

- Princess Elena "Hélène" Trubetskaya (1853–1917), who married Pavel Pavlovich Demidov, 2nd Prince of San Donato.
- Prince Sergei Trubetskoy (1855–1856), who died young.
- Princess Alexandra Trubetskaya (1857–1949).
- Princess Olga Trubetskaya (1860–1879), who died from consumption at the age of 19.
- Prince Alexander Trubetskoy (1867–1912/7)
- Princess Maria Trubetskaya (1872–1954).

Princess Trubetskaya died on 30 March 1907 in Saint Petersburg.

=== Descendants ===
Through her eldest daughter Elena, she was a grandmother of Princess Aurora Pavlovna Demidova di San Donato, great-grandmother of Prince Regent Paul of Yugoslavia.
