= Gennadi Gerasimov =

Soviet and Russian diplomat (1930–2010)

- Геннадий Герасимов
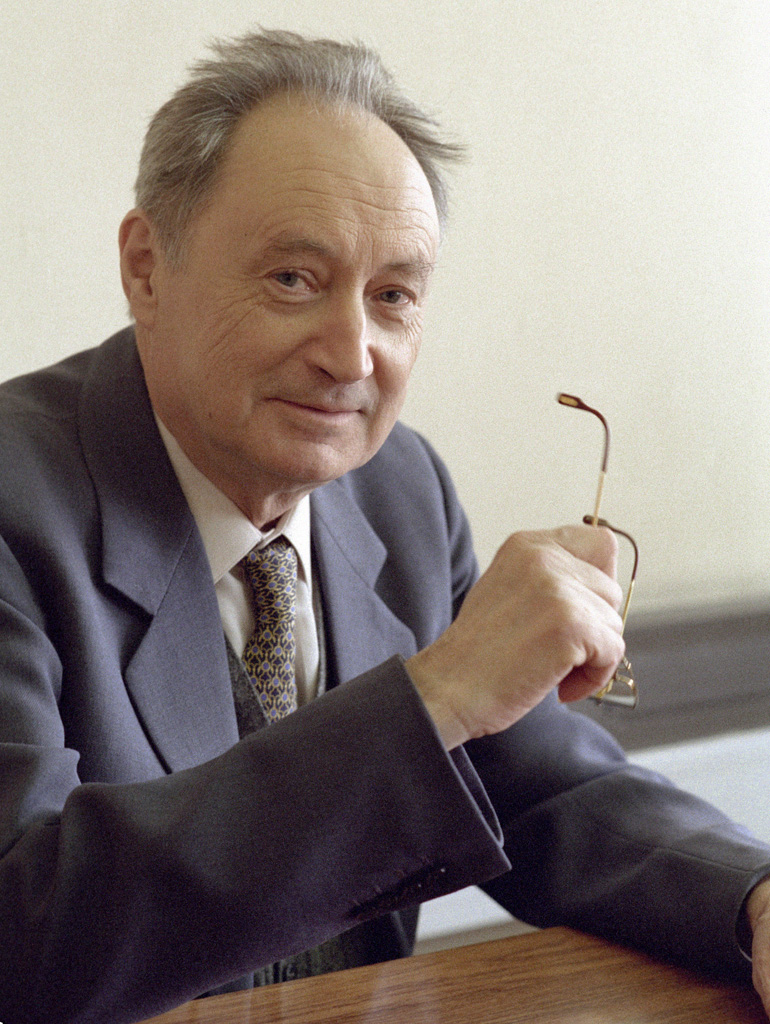
- Gerasimov in 2001

Russian Ambassador to Portugal (From 1990 until 1991 Soviet)
- In office 1990–1995
- Preceded by: Valentin Kasatkin
- Succeeded by: Aleksandr Smirnov

Personal details
- Born: Gennadi Ivanovich Gerasimov; 3 March 1930 Yelabuga, Tatar ASSR, Russian SFSR, Soviet Union (now Tatarstan, Russia)
- Died: 14 September 2010 (aged 80) Moscow, Russia

Gennadi (or Gennady) Ivanovich Gerasimov (Russian: Геннадий Иванович Герасимов; 3 March 1930 – 14 September 2010) was the last Soviet, and then Russian ambassador to Portugal from 1990 to 1995. Previously he was foreign affairs spokesman for Mikhail Gorbachev and press secretary to Eduard Shevardnadze.

He is noted for coining the expression "Sinatra Doctrine" in reference to Gorbachev's non-intervention policy with respect to other members of the Warsaw Pact. When asked, during Mikhail Gorbachev's visit to Prague in 1987, what the difference was between the Prague Spring and perestroika, Gerasimov replied: "nineteen years".

He was recognized in 1990 as Communicator of the Year by the (American) National Association of Government Communicators (NAGC).

He is mentioned in the Billy Bragg song "Moving the Goalposts".
