= List of ambassadors of Russia to Portugal =

Ambassador of the Russian Federation to the Portuguese Republic
- Embaixada da Federação da Rússia na República Portuguesa
- Emblem of the Russian Foreign Ministry
- Incumbent; Mikhail Kamynin since 18 June 2018
- Ministry of Foreign Affairs; Embassy of Russia in Lisbon
- Style: His Excellency; The Honourable
- Reports to: Minister of Foreign Affairs
- Seat: Lisbon
- Appointer: President of Russia
- Term length: At the pleasure of the president
- Website: Embassy of Russia in Portugal

The ambassador of Russia to Portugal is the official representative of the president and the government of the Russian Federation to the president and the government of Portugal.

The ambassador and his staff work at large in the Russian embassy in Lisbon. The current Russian ambassador to Portugal is Mikhail Kamynin, incumbent since 18 June 2018.

== History of diplomatic relations ==
Formal diplomatic relations between Spain and Russia date back to the late eighteenth century, though there had been contacts between Portugal and the Russian Empire since the first half of the century. Trade was of particular interest, and records indicate that the Portuguese government approached Peter the Great in 1724, with offers to establish more formalised trade relations. Peter responded with a decree to appoint a consul to Lisbon to oversee trade links, but little information survives of this mission. Trade however continued to develop, and by 1769, the first official consulate general was opened in Lisbon, with Hamburg banker João Antonio Borcher appointed as consul on 2 October 1769. With contacts developing, in 1778 an agreement was reached to establish formal diplomatic relations between the courts of Maria I of Portugal and Empress Catherine the Great. The Portuguese ambassador, Francisco José Horta Machado, arrived in Saint Petersburg on 20 October 1779, and the first Russian ambassador, Count Maximilian Nesselrode arrived in Lisbon on 4 July 1780. The exchange of envoys continued throughout the eighteenth and nineteenth centuries, and into the twentieth century. This included the period of the occupation of Portugal by troops of the First French Empire in 1807, and the transfer of the Portuguese court to Brazil that year. The Portuguese court, and the Russian diplomatic mission, was thereafter based in Rio de Janeiro until its return to Lisbon in 1821.

There was a brief period following the 5 October 1910 revolution which overthrew the Portuguese monarchy and established the First Portuguese Republic, when Russia did not recognise the new government, but relations were restored with Tsar Nicholas II's official decree on 27 September 1911. Relations were maintained following the February Revolution brought the end of the Russian Empire and the establishment of the Russian Provisional Government, but were broken off after the October Revolution and the Bolshevik seizure of power. Diplomatic relations remained broken until 9 June 1974, when the Soviet Union established relations with Portugal. The exchange of ambassadors resumed with the appointment of Arnold Kalinin on 26 July 1974. Exchange of ambassadors continued throughout the rest of the existence of the Soviet Union. With the dissolution of the Soviet Union in 1991, Portugal recognised the Russian Federation as its successor state. Gennadi Gerasimov represented Russia until 1993, and since then ambassadors have continued to be exchanged between the two countries.

== List of representatives of Russia to Portugal (1778–present) ==
=== Russian Empire to Portugal (1778–1917) ===
Name	Title	Appointment	Termination	Notes
Maximilian Nesselrode	Envoy	1778	1789	
Andrey Forsman	Chargé d'affaires	1789	1796	
Aleksandr Bibikov	Envoy	December 1798	January 1799	
Pyotr Maltits	Envoy	1799	1799	
Ivan Vasilyev	Envoy	9 May 1800	10 September 1806	
Andrey Dubachevsky	Chargé d'affaires	April 1807	June 1811	
Friedrich von der Pahlen	Envoy	11 July 1811	27 April 1815	
Aleksey Sverchkov	Chargé d'affaires	1815	1816	
Pyotr Balk-Polev	Envoy	27 April 1815	13 November 1817	
Diederik Tuyll van Serooskerken	Envoy	13 November 1817	28 June 1819	
Frants Borel	Chargé d'affaires	22 November 1819	3 October 1828	
Lev Pototsky	Envoy	1 January 1829	20 January 1833	
Aleksey Stroganov	Chargé d'affaires before 13 March 1845; Envoy after 13 March 1845	20 June 1842	11 March 1848	
Sergey Lomonosov	Envoy	11 March 1848	6 December 1853	
Ivan Ozerov	Envoy	13 February 1854	1 August 1863	
Khristian Kudryavsky	Envoy	3 March 1864	3 April 1871	
Dmitry Glinka	Envoy	3 April 1871	14 May 1883	
Pavel Arapov	Envoy	2 June 1883	29 March 1885	
Nikolai Fonton	Envoy	21 May 1885	9 April 1891	
Mikhail Khitrovo	Envoy	9 April 1891	28 July 1892	
Dmitry Shevich	Envoy	28 July 1892	9 February 1896	
Ernest Meyendorf	Envoy	10 February 1896	1 November 1899	
Valery Zhadovsky	Envoy	16 November 1899	1902	
Aleksandr Koyander	Envoy	1902	8 November 1910	
Yakov von Tal	Chargé d'affaires	1911	1912	
Pyotr Botkin	Envoy	1912	3 March 1917	

=== Russian Provisional Government to Portugal (1917) ===
Name	Title	Appointment	Termination	Notes
Rolf Ungern-Shternberg	Chargé d'affaires	1917	1917	
Nikolai Etter	Envoy	1917	26 October 1917	

=== Soviet Union to Portugal (1974–1991) ===
Name	Title	Appointment	Termination	Notes
Arnold Kalinin	Ambassador	26 July 1974	17 December 1982	Credentials presented on 9 August 1974
Valentin Vdovin	Ambassador	17 December 1982	22 October 1987	Credentials presented on 10 February 1983
Valentin Kasatkin	Ambassador	22 October 1987	1990	
Gennadi Gerasimov	Ambassador	1990	25 December 1991	

=== Russian Federation to Portugal (1991–present) ===
Name	Title	Appointment	Termination	Notes
Gennadi Gerasimov	Ambassador	25 December 1991	16 March 1993	
Aleksandr Smirnov	Ambassador	16 March 1993	28 August 1998	
Gennady Tarasov	Ambassador	27 August 1998	1 February 2002	
Bakhter Khakimov	Ambassador	19 June 2002	11 April 2006	
Pavel Petrovsky	Ambassador	11 April 2006	25 January 2013	
Oleg Belous	Ambassador	25 January 2013	8 May 2018	Credentials presented on 9 April 2013
Mikhail Kamynin	Ambassador	18 June 2018		Credentials presented on 1 October 2018
