= Aleksandr Bibikov =

Russian statesman and military officer

Aleksandr Ilyich Bibikov
- Алекса́ндр Ильи́ч Би́биков
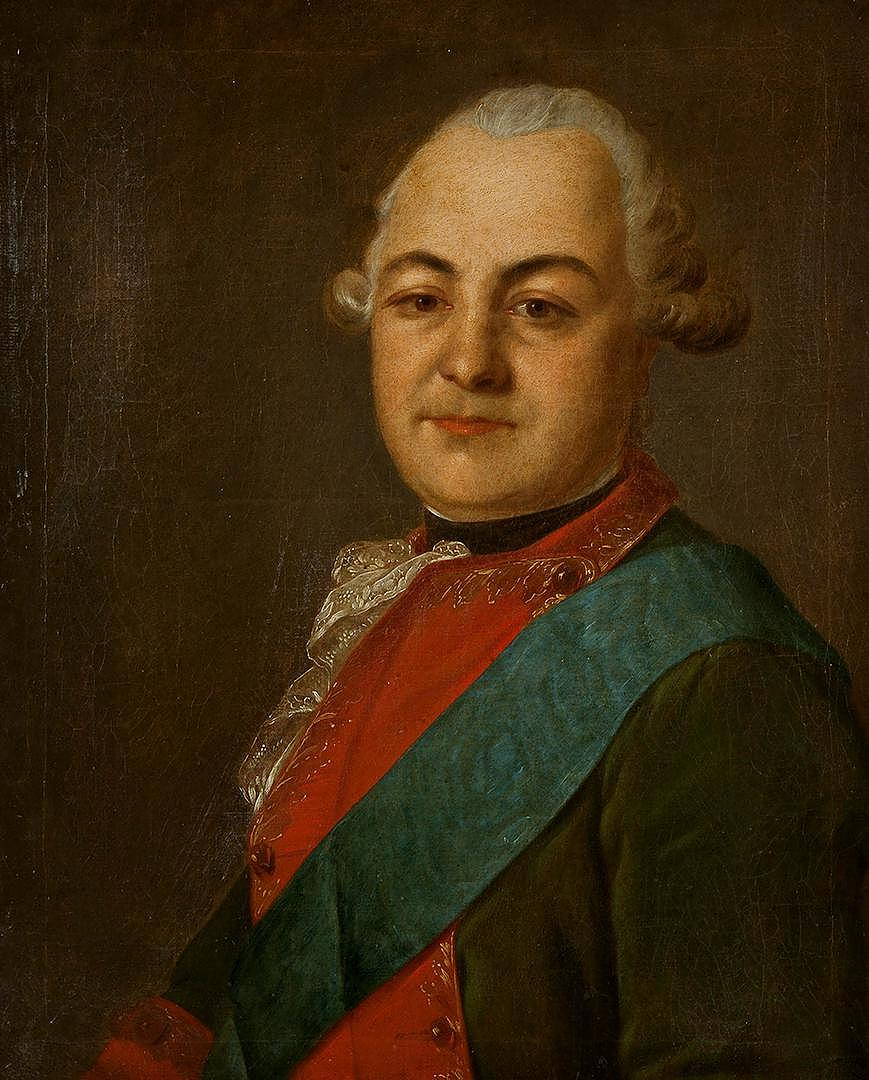
- Painting by Fyodor Rokotov; Hermitage Museum
- Born: 10 June 1729; Moscow
- Died: 20 April 1774 (aged 44); Bugulma
- Military career
- Allegiance: Imperial Russian Army
- Rank: Colonel
- Conflicts: Seven Years' War; Pugachev's Rebellion
- Awards: Order of the White Eagle

Aleksandr Ilyich Bibikov (Russian: Алекса́ндр Ильи́ч Би́биков) (10 June [O.S. 30 May] 1729, Moscow – 20 April [O.S. 20 April] 1774, Bugulma) was a Russian statesman and military officer.

Bibikov came from an old noble family; Field Marshal Mikhail Kutuzov was his brother-in-law. He began his military service in 1746, participating in the Seven Years' War (1756–1763). He was unit commander in the Battle of Zorndorf. His unit lost 60 officers and about half of the soldiers but did not retreat. He was promoted to Colonel Rank by Empress Elizabeth of Russia. He also participated in Battle of Kunersdorf and thereafter was appointed military commandant of Frankfurt.

Bibikov acted against the Polish Bar Confederation (1771–1774). In 1773 Bibikov was assigned to suppress Yemelyan Pugachev's uprising. In March 1774, Bibikov forced Pugachev's rebel army to abandon its siege on the city of Orenburg. By spring 1774, Bibikov had earned the rank of General and he defeated Pugachev at Tatishchevo, west of Orenburg. In the letter to Catherine II of Russia, he wrote: "I expect from v. V. of the resolution of the boundary local matter not on the Polish statutes, but the zbornomu (cathedral) packing code". It notes after the transfer from Poland Bibikov: "I will finally not be obstacle I see and to the intentions of the managers fate Polish". During this campaign Bibikov fell ill with cholera and died, aged 44, Empress granted a large estate to its family. All data attest to the fact that Bibikov connected the bright military and administrative abilities, large diplomatic time with the independence of persuasions and the incorruptible honesty.

His son from his marriage with Princess Anastasia Semyonovna Kozlovskaya, Aleksandr Aleksandrovich Bibikov, served as a military commander in the Napoleonic Wars, and held several diplomatic posts.
