= Artemiy Ivanovich Vorontsov =

Russian senator and noble (1748–1813)

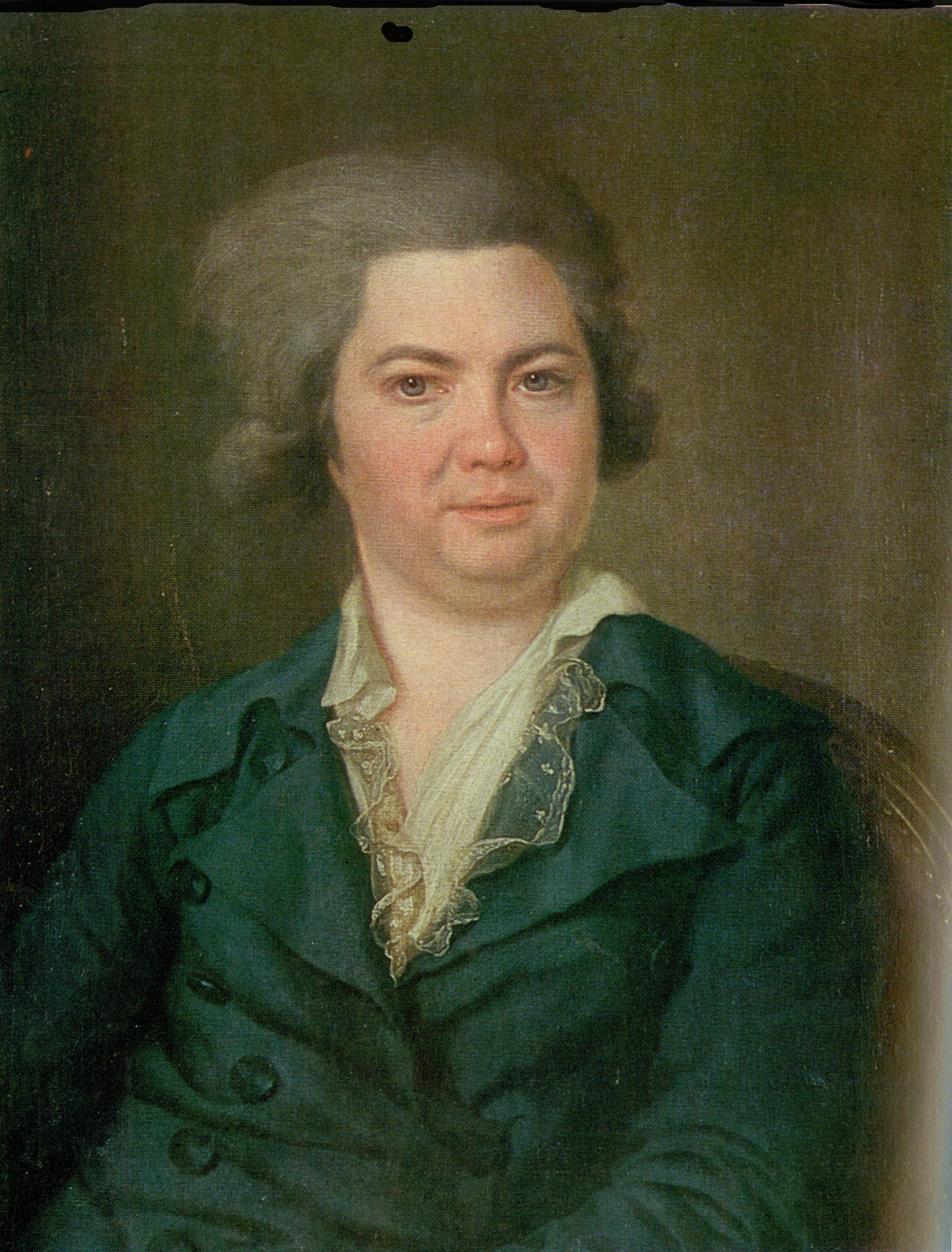
Count Artemiy Vorontsov (late 1780s) by Dmitry Levitzky

Count Artemiy Ivanovich Vorontsov (Russian: Артемий Иванович Воронцов; 1748–1813) was a noble of the Russian Empire. He was a senator, Active Privy Councillor, and owner of the Voronovo estate, as well as the godfather of Alexander Pushkin.

== Biography ==
Artemiy Ivanovich Vorontsov was born in 1748 into the noble Vorontsov family. His father, Ivan Illarionovich Vorontsov (1719-1786), and his brothers, were counts of the Holy Roman Empire, and also played a prominent role in public service and at court. Artemiy's uncles, state Chancellor Mikhail Illarionovich Vorontsov and General-Chief Roman Vorontsov, reached the highest ranks and positions in the civil service.

Artemiy Ivanovich enlisted in the Life Guard Horse Regiment. He was promoted from sergeant major to cornet in the same regiment on April 16, 1765. Later the Catherine the Great granted him the rank of chamber junker on August 15, 1773. Initially, Vorontsov continued to be listed in the regiment, but a month later he was dismissed at his own request, with the rank of second-captain on September 10. From that time he was in the court service.

Vorontsov was granted the rank of full chamberlain In 1783. Three years later, Catherine the Great appointed him a member of the Commission on Commerce, the leading role in which was played by his cousin Alexander Vorontsov.

Later Artemiy Vorontsov was appointed a senator on September 22, 1792. In this capacity, he was in the service at the time of the accession to the throne of the Emperor Paul I of Russia. At his coronation on April 5, 1797, Paul I of Russia elevated Artemiy Vorontsov and his cousins (Semyon Vorontsov and A. R. Vorontsov) to the count's dignity of the Russian Empire. Artemiy Vorontsov was made an Active Privy Councillor on October 28, 1798 and few days later he was awarded the Order of St. Anna on November 8.

== Family ==
Artemiy Vorontsov married Praskovya Fyodorovna Kvashnina-Samarina (1749-1797) in 1773. She was the daughter of the Chief Magistrate's chief president, the actual State Councilor Fyodor Petrovich Kvashnin-Samarin (1704-1770) and Anna Yuryevna Rzhevskaya (1720-1781) (from Rzhevsky family), the sister of Sarah Yuryevna Rzhevskaya, the great-grandmother of Alexander Pushkin. Praskovya Fyodorovna was a great-aunt of the poet. Artemiy Ivanovich Vorontsov was his Godparent at baptism on June 8, 1799 in the Yelokhovo Cathedral.

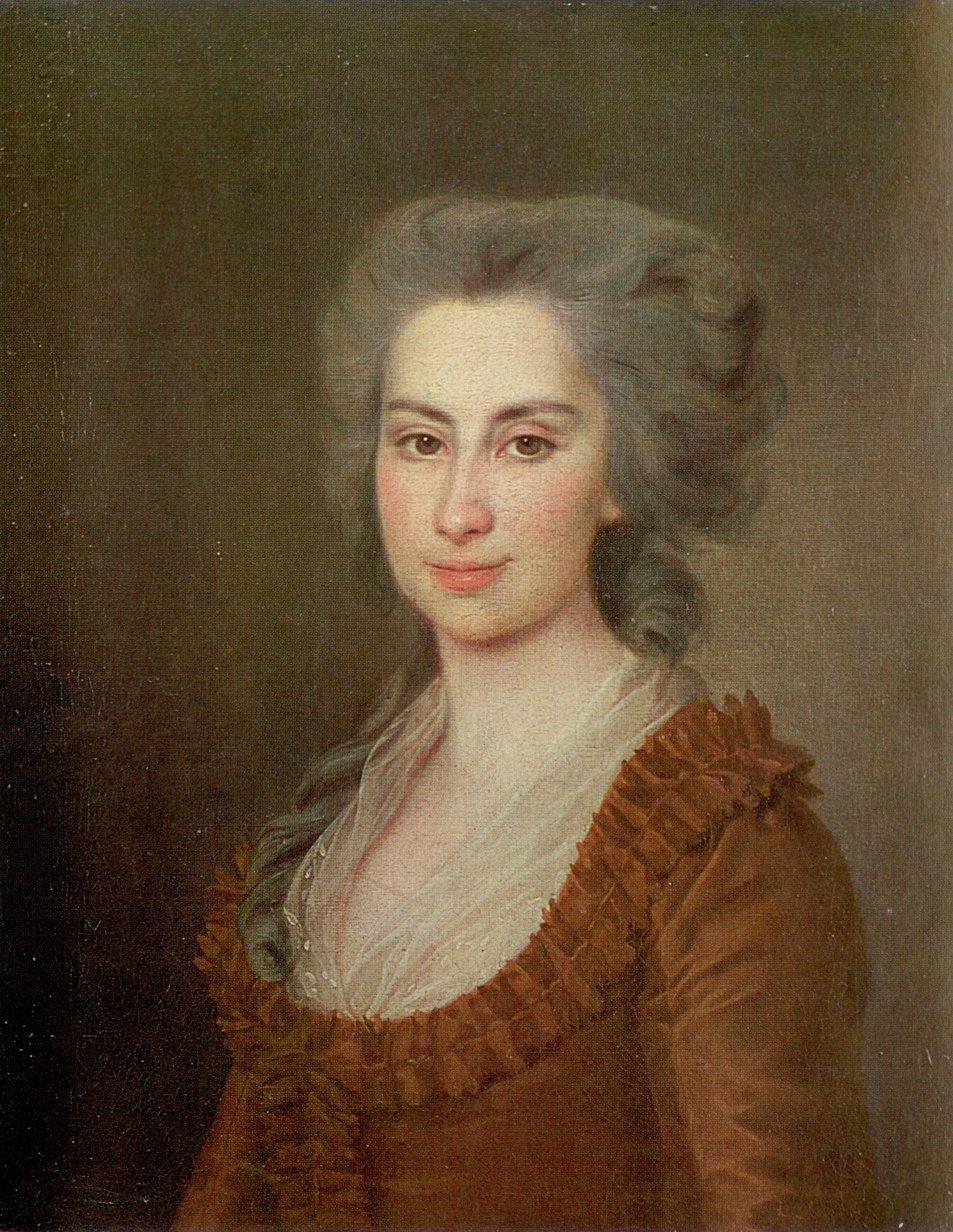
Countess Praskovya Vorontsova (late 1780s) by Dmitry Levitzky

Artemiy and Praskovya had five children:

- Maria Artemevna Vorontsova (1776-1866), lady-in-waiting to the Empress Maria Feodorovna (Sophie Dorothea of Württemberg).She moved to Italy in the 1820s and converted to Catholicism. Maria died in Florence in 1866.
- Anna Artemevna Buturlina (née Vorontsova; 1777–1854), she was the second cousin of M. A. Gannibal, a relation of Abram Gannibal. Anna married her second cousin, Count Dmitry Petrovich Buturlin in 1793. She moved to Italy with her family in 1817 and lived there until the end of her days. She converted to Catholicism. Anna was buried in Florence.
- Alexey Artemevich Vorontsov (1777 — ?),
- Ekaterina Artemevna Vorontsova (1780-1836), lady-in-waiting to Princess Juliane of Saxe-Coburg-Saalfeld.
- Praskovya Artemevna Vorontsova (1786-1842).

== Sources ==
- http://lib.pushkinskijdom.ru/LinkClick.aspx?fileticket=VVnqTtRuRXY%3D&tabid=10358
