= Dmitry Glinka (diplomat) =

Russian diplomat

Dmitry Grigoryevich Glinka (Russian: Дмитрий Григорьевич Глинка; 28 July 1808 – 14 May 1883) was a Russian diplomat, privy councillor in deed, and sociologist.

== Biography ==
Dmitry Glinka came from a Russian noble family with Polish roots. He graduated from the boarding school of Saint Petersburg University in 1824. On 17 January 1825 he joined the Ministry of Foreign Affairs and began his diplomatic career, holding posts such as second secretary at the Russian embassy in Copenhagen (since May 1831), chief secretary in Stockholm (since March 1837), and then counsellor in Berlin (since July 1846).

In 1834 Dmitry married Christine Justine Cathérine Blanche von Bangeman-Huygens, comtesse de Løvendal (24 February 1810 - 1893). In 1836 their daughter Justine Glinka (Iustinia Dmitrievna Glinka) (21 July 1836 - 1916) was born, and in 1838 their son Nikolai Dmitrievich Glinka (1838 - 1 April 1884) was born.

While in Stockholm, Dmitry Glinka served as charge d'affairs from 22 May 1841 until 14 March 1844. He was promoted to the rank of state councillor on 25 March 1844. Some six years later Dmitry Glinka was appointed charge d'affairs at the House of Hesse-Darmstadt, House of Hesse-Kassel, and House of Nassau. On 8 April 1851 he was promoted to state councillor in deed.

In 1853, Dmitry Glinka was dispatched to Frankfurt am Main, where he would develop a rapport with Otto von Bismarck. Being a supporter of an alliance between Russia, France and Prussia, Dmitry Glinka was trying to impede the anti-Russian policy of Otto Theodor von Manteuffel, a Prussian foreign minister. On 8 June 1853 he was dismissed as charge d'affairs at the House of Hesse and then three years later appointed envoy extraordinary and minister plenipotentiary to Brazil, becoming privy councillor in April 1863.

In 1871, Dmitry Glinka was transferred to Lisbon to act as envoy extraordinary and minister plenipotentiary, remaining on this post until his death. On 12 April 1881 he was promoted to privy councillor in deed.

== Awards ==
Dmitry Glinka was awarded the Order of Saint Stanislaus, 1st class (1855), Order of St. Anna, 1st class (1860), Order of St. Vladimir, 2nd class (1866), and Order of the White Eagle (1875). He is the author of Esquisse d'une théorie du droit naturel (Berlin, 1835) and La philosophie du droit ou explication des rapports sociaux (Paris, 1842).

== Bibliography ==
- Chirkin, Dmitry (2000). "Konstanty Glinka (1867-1927). Życie i działalność naukowa" [Konstantin Glinka (1867-1927). Life and scientific activity] (PDF). Kwartalnik Historii Nauki i Techniki. 45 (1): 87–102.
