= Dmitry Levitzky =

Russian painter (1735–1822)

- Дмитрий Левицкий
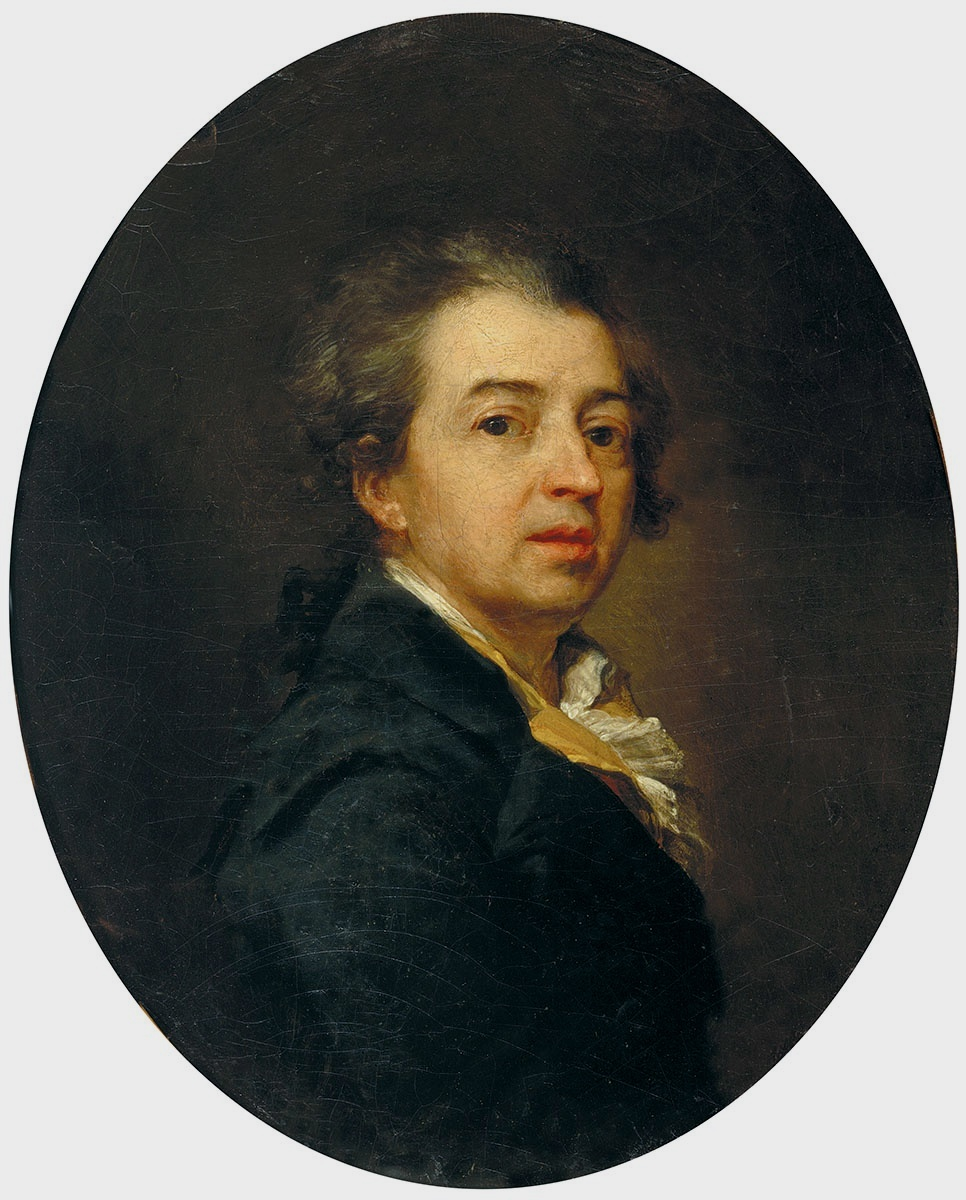
- Self-portrait, c. 1783
- Born: May 1735; Kiev, Russian Empire
- Died: 4 April 1822 (aged 86); Saint Petersburg, Russian Empire
- Resting place: Smolensky Cemetery, St. Petersburg
- Education: Imperial Academy of Arts (1769)
- Known for: Portrait painting
- Style: Classicism
- Elected: Member Academy of Arts (1770)

Dmitry Grigoryevich Levitzky or Levitsky (Russian: Дмитрий Григорьевич Левицкий; Ukrainian: Дмитро Григорович Левицький; 24 May [O.S. 13 May] 1735 – 16 April [O.S. 4 April] 1822) was a Ukrainian-born Russian portrait painter and academician.

== Biography ==
He was born in May 1735 in Kiev to Grigory Kirillovich Levitsky, a priest, who was also an amateur painter and engraver and served as his first art teacher. In 1758, he moved to Saint Petersburg to become a pupil of the Russian artist Aleksey Antropov, who had been in Kiev to create decorative paintings at the Cathedral of St Andrew. He also studied with Giuseppe Valeriani. In 1764, he established himself as a free-lance artist.

In 1770, Levitzky became famous after the exhibition of six of his portraits in the Imperial Academy of Arts; notably for a portrait of the architect Alexander Kokorinov. As a result, he was named an academician and appointed as professor of the portrait painting class at the Academy. He remained in this position until 1788. In 1807, he returned to the Academy.

In 1772–1776, Levitzky worked on a series of portraits of the pupils of the privileged women's establishment, the Smolny Institute for Young Ladies, in St. Petersburg. They were commissioned by Catherine II. The girls are depicted performing dances, music, and plays.

Levitzky's eyesight began to deteriorate at the end of the 1790s, and he rarely painted as a result of this. He died on 16 April 1822 in St. Petersburg.

== Works ==
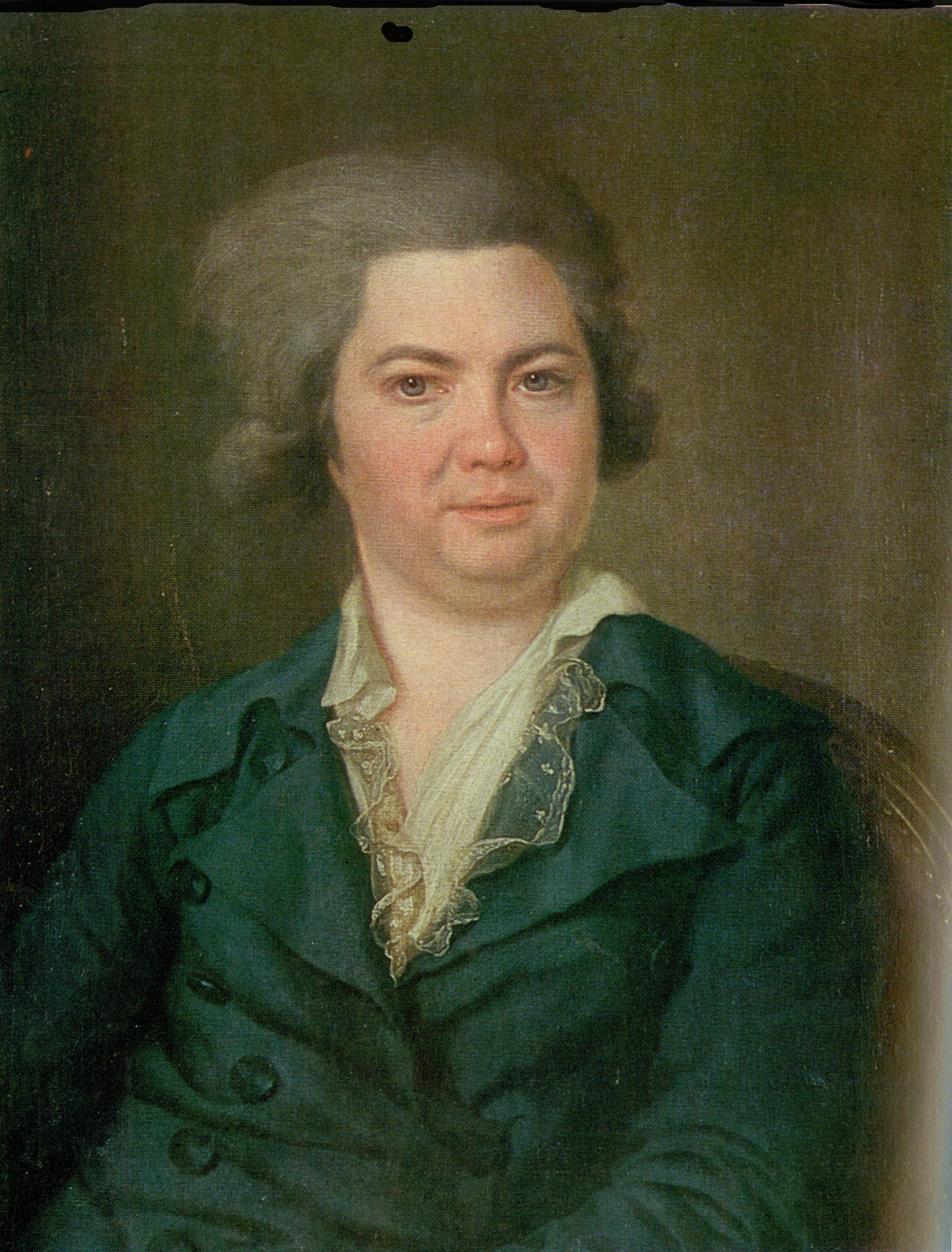
Count Artemiy Vorontsov (late 1780s)

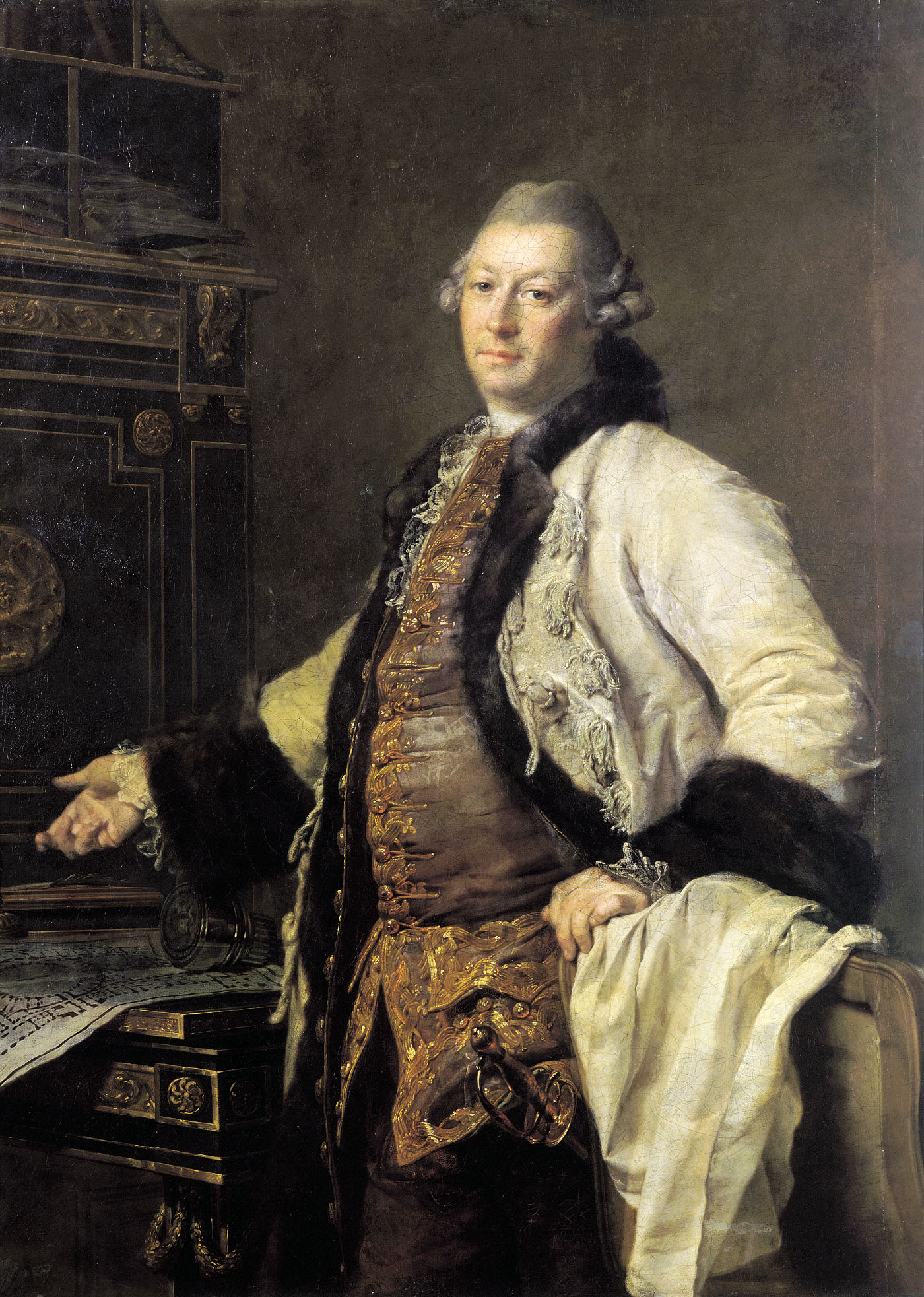
Architect Alexander Kokorinov, Director and First Rector of the Imperial Academy of Arts (1769)

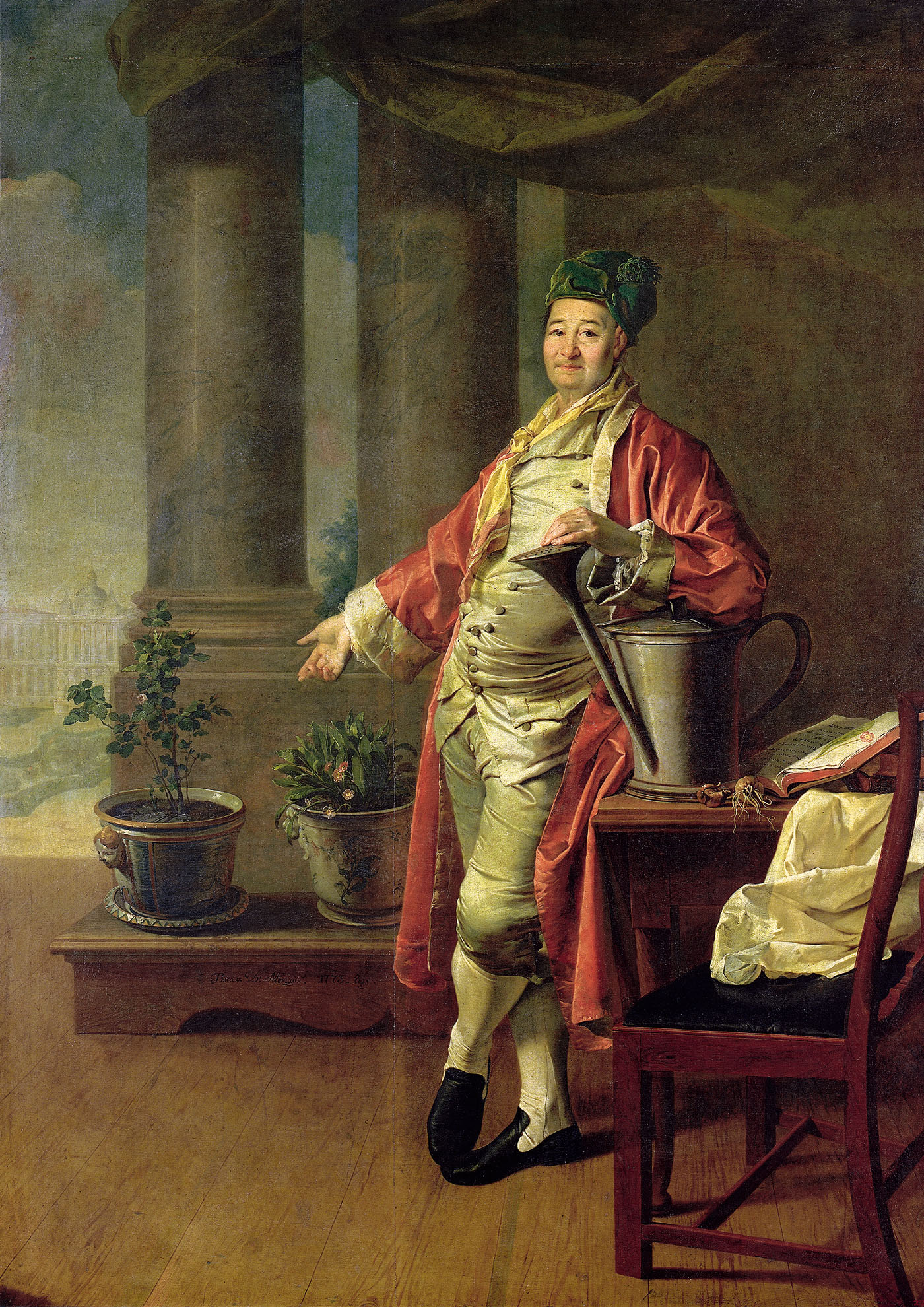
Prokofiy Demidov (1773)

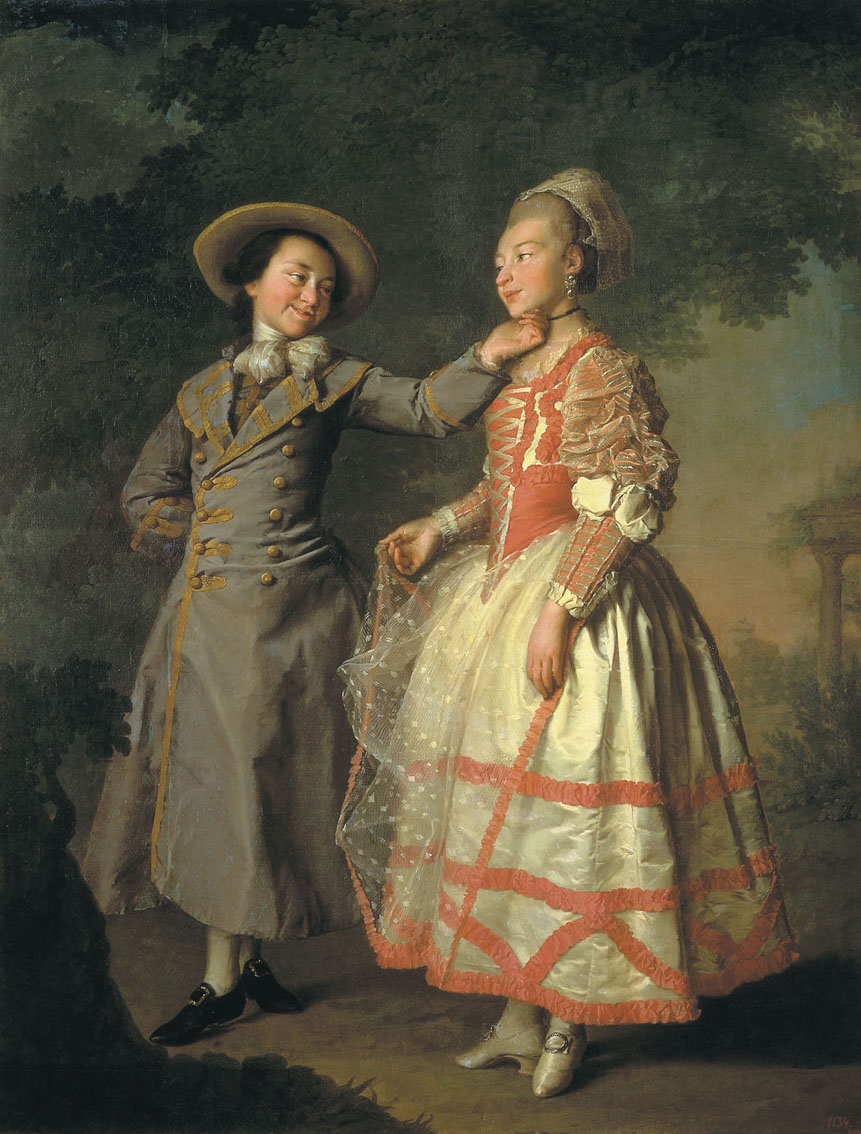
E. N. Khruschova and Princess E. N. Khovanskaya (1773)

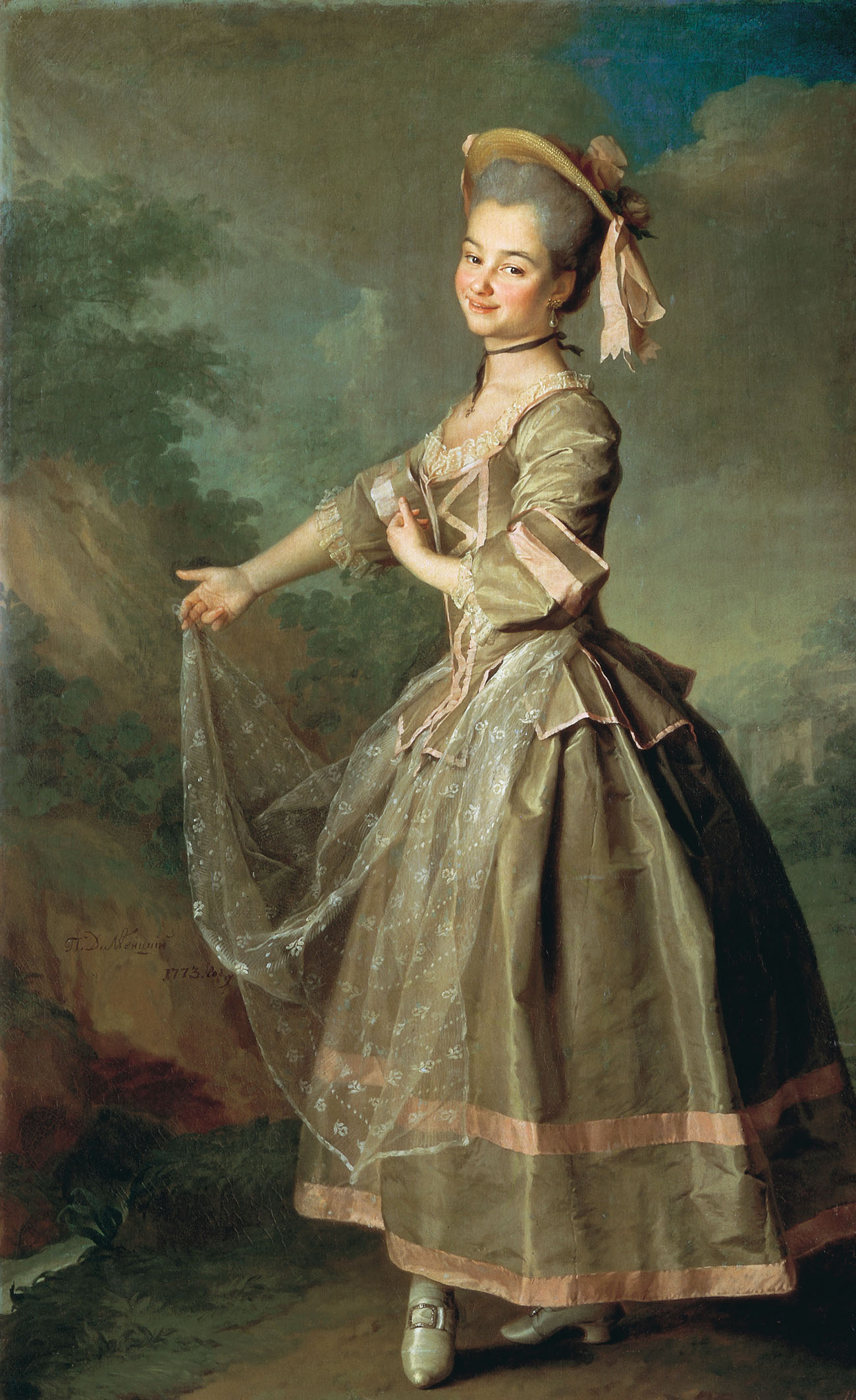
Ekaterina Nelidova (1773)

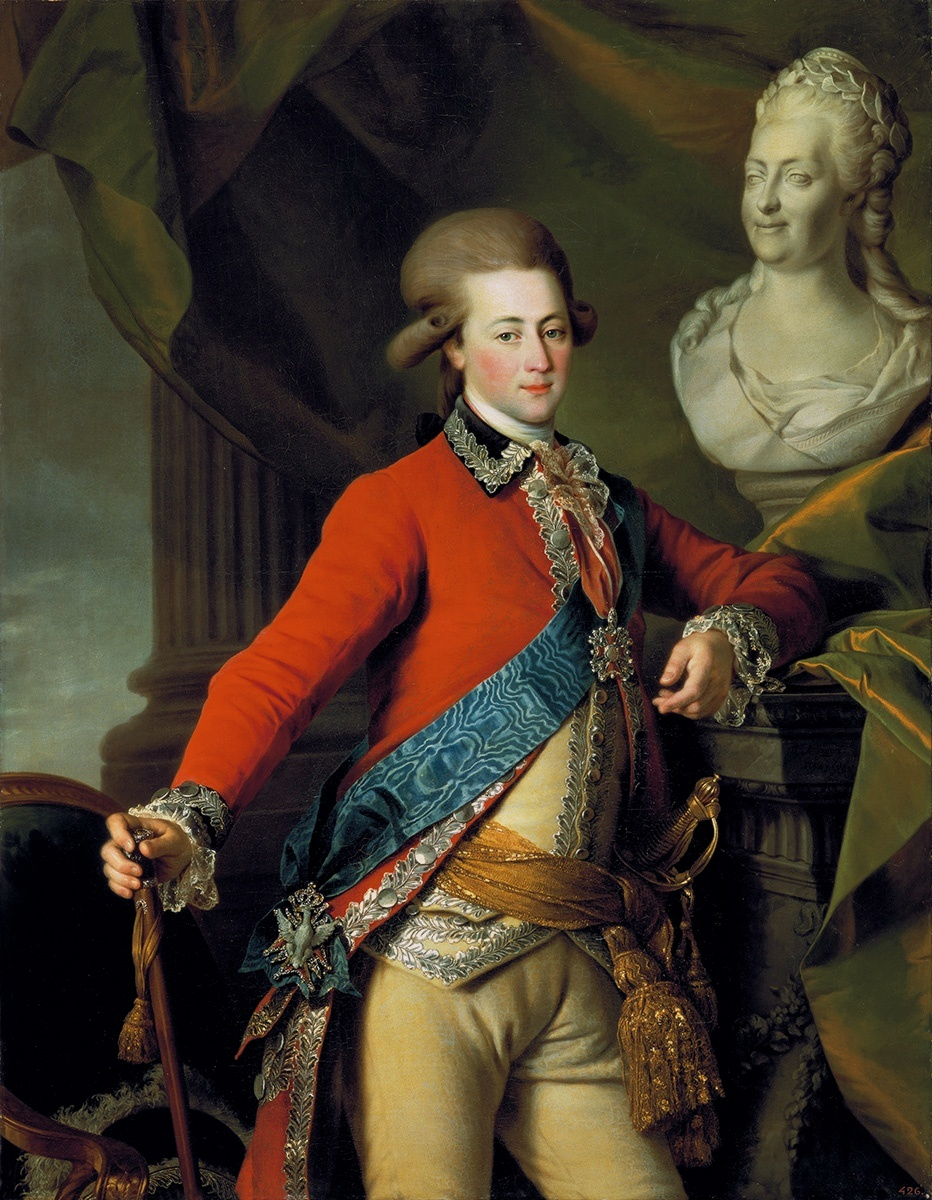
Alexander Lanskoy, Aide-de-camp to the Empress (1782)

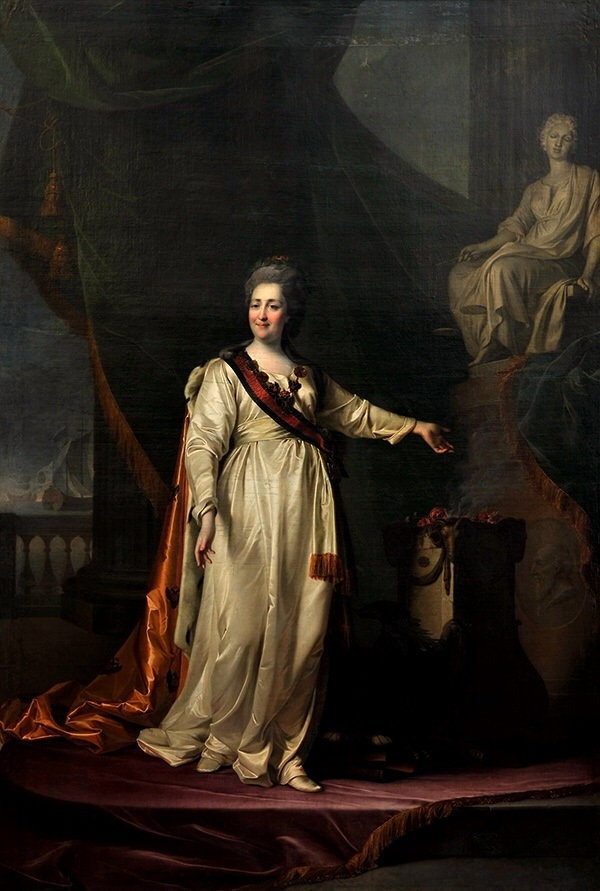
Catherine II as Legislator in the Temple of the Goddess of Justice (1783)

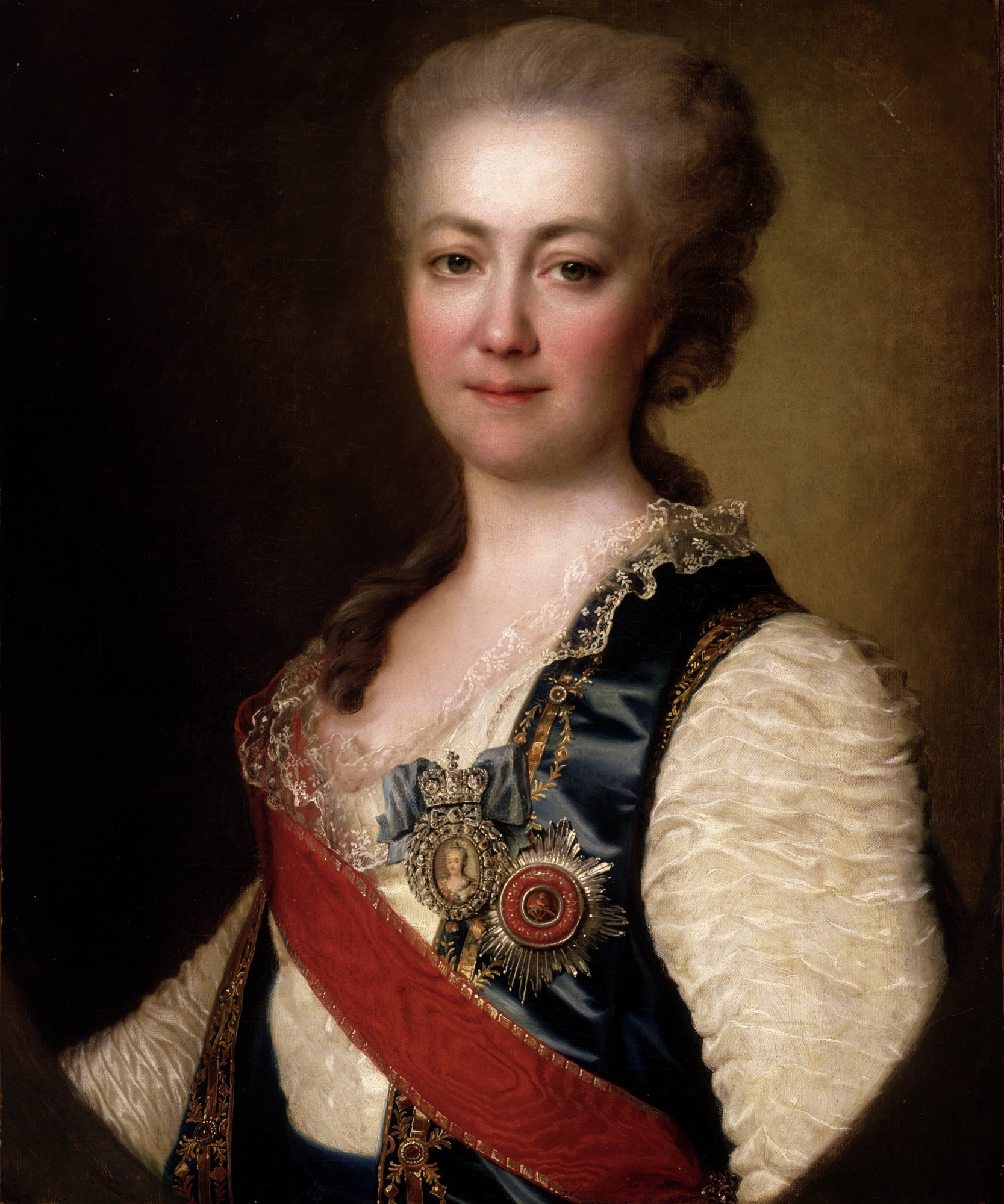
Yekaterina Romanovna Vorontsova-Dashkova (1784)

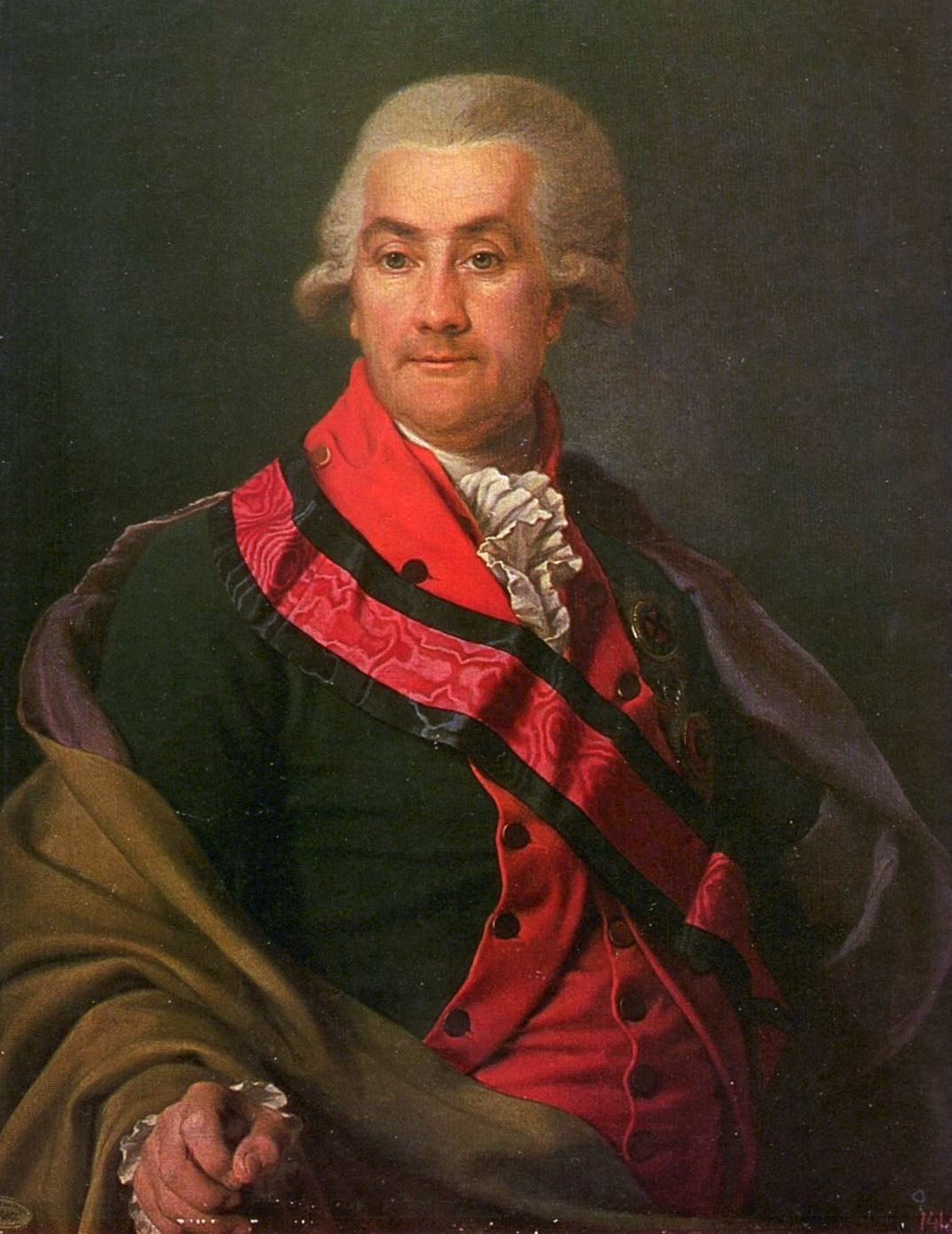
Portrait of General Iosif Igelström (1790)

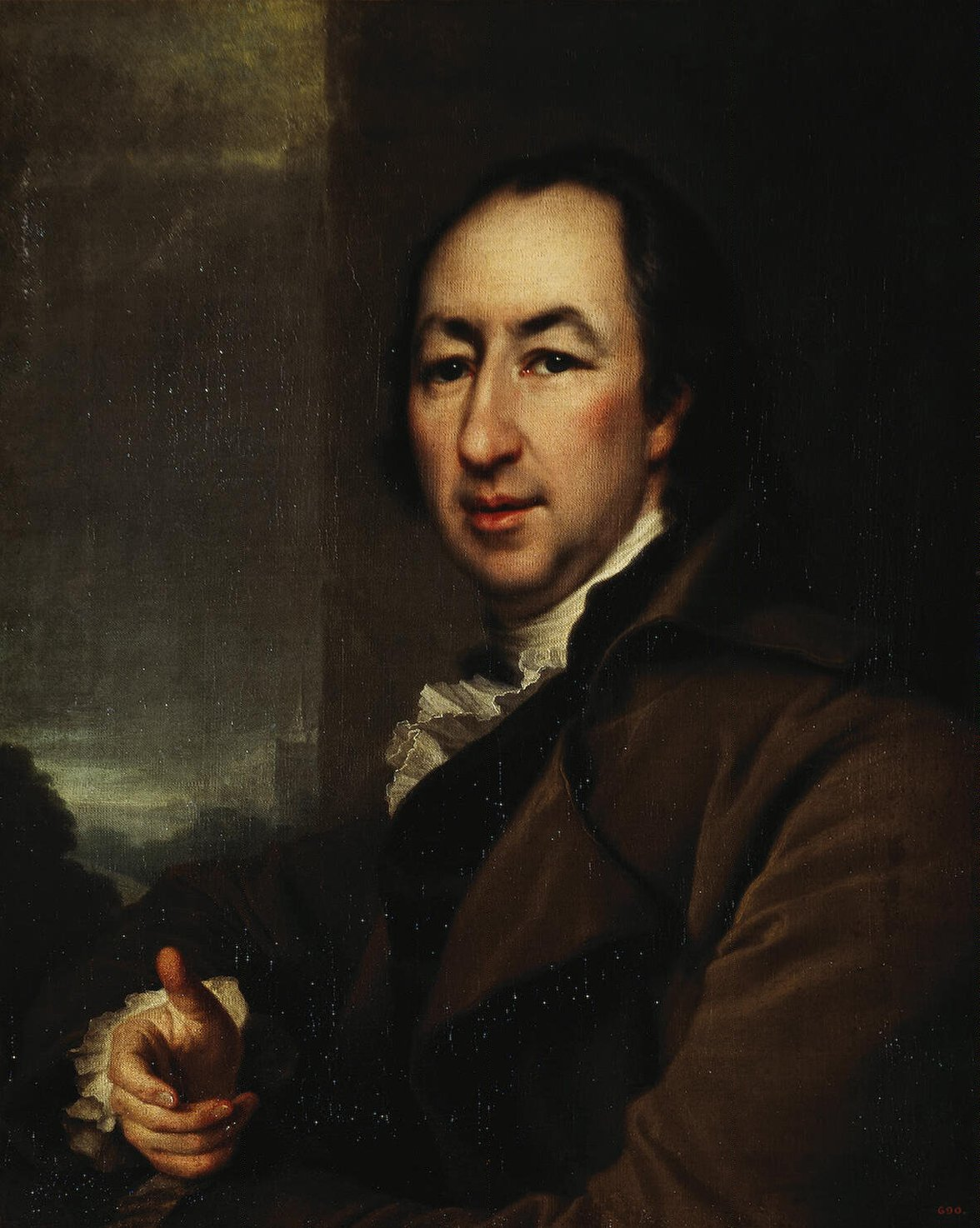
Nikolay Novikov (1797)

== Sources ==
- Komelova, G. (2003). "Levitsky, Dmitry". Grove Art Online.
