= Aleksandr Aleksandrovich Bibikov =

Russian military officer

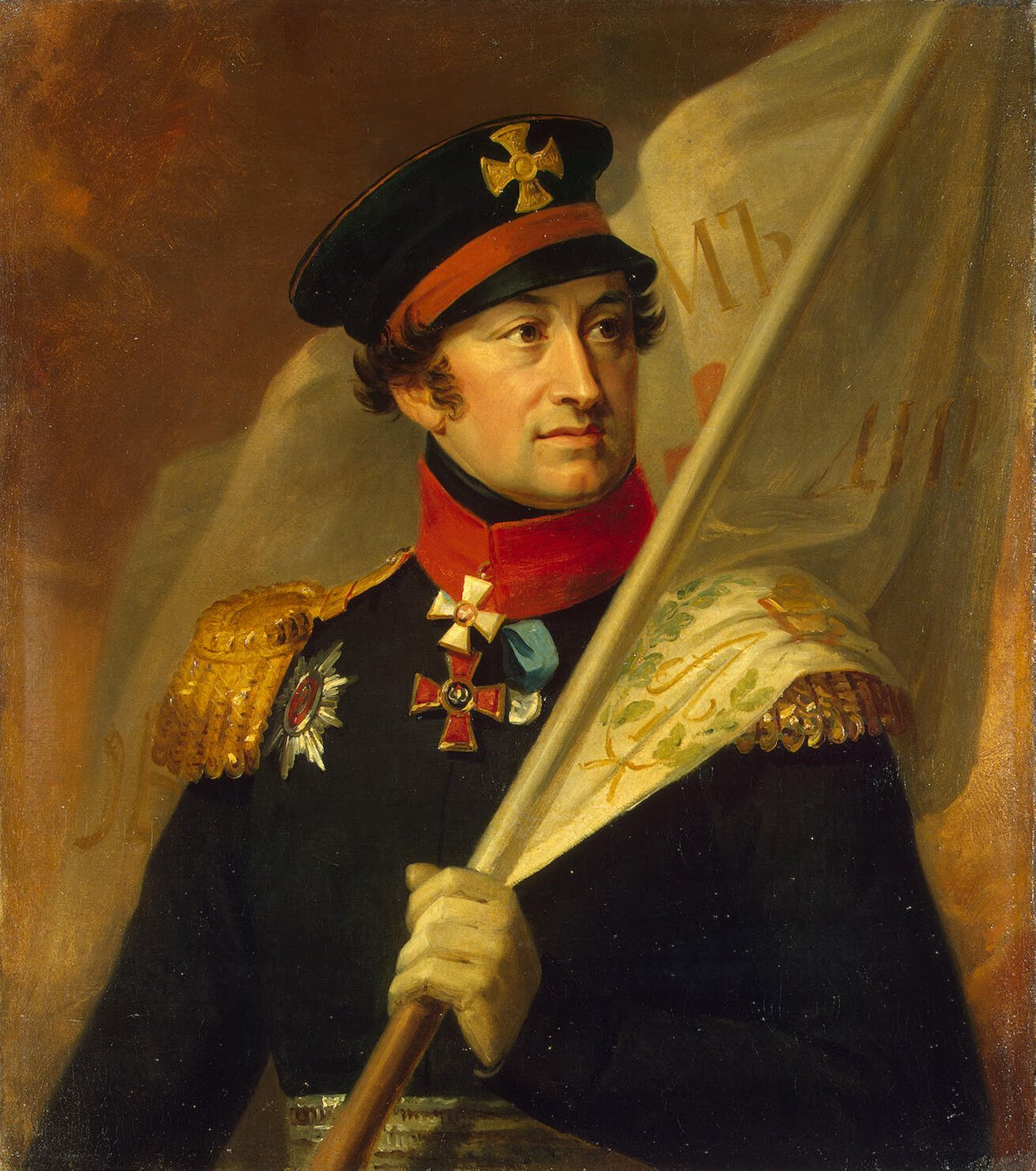
- Portrait of Bibikov by George Dawe
- Born: 18 January [O.S. 7 January] 1765
- Died: 1 August [O.S. 20 July] 1822 (aged 57); Dresden
- Burial place: Lazarevskoe Cemetery, Alexander Nevsky Lavra, Saint Petersburg
- Spouse: Anna Vasilyevna Khanykova
- Relatives: Aleksandr (father)
- Military career
- Allegiance: Russian Empire
- Branch: Imperial Russian Army
- Service years: 1774–1813
- Rank: General
- Conflicts: Russo-Swedish War; Battle of Porrassalmi; Battle of Rochensalm; Napoleonic Wars; Second Battle of Polotsk; Battle of Smoliani; Battle of Borisov; Battle of Berezina; Siege of Danzig
- Awards: Order of St. Anna First Class; Order of St. Vladimir Second Class; Order of St. George Third Class; Order of St. George Fourth Class; Two Golden Swords "For Bravery"

Aleksandr Aleksandrovich Bibikov (Russian: Алекса́ндр Алекса́ндрович Би́биков) (18 January [O.S. 7 January] 1765 – 1 August [O.S. 20 July] 1822) was an officer of the Imperial Russian Army, who saw service during the Russo-Swedish War and the Napoleonic Wars. He was ambassador to several countries, and also served as a senator in the Governing Senate.

Born into a noble family as the son of an eminent general of Empress Elizabeth's service, Aleksandr Bibikov was enrolled into the lists of the Izmaylovsky Regiment at just three years old. After his father's death on campaign in 1774, the younger Bibikov was promoted to officer status at nine years old, and by the time he was old enough to join the ranks of his regiment, he already held the rank of captain. He served in the Empress Catherine's retinue for a time, before taking part in the Russo-Swedish War, and seeing action on a number of occasions. Wounded in battle, and presented several awards, he entered the civil service during the years of peace, and was given various state and diplomatic appointments by the Emperor Paul I. After a series of brief postings to the Portuguese court and the Electorate of Saxony, he was for a time unemployed during the early reign of Emperor Alexander I, though he eventually returned to serve in various diplomatic and civil service roles.

With Napoleon's invasion of Russia in 1812, Bibikov petitioned to serve in the army once more, and was appointed to command various militias, including those of St Petersburg and Novgorod. He and his forces distinguished themselves at the Second Battle of Polotsk, and at the Battle of Smoliani, where he was wounded in the leg. Unable to ride or walk, he fought the next two battles, at Borisov and Berezina, from a sleigh, and when his horses were killed at Berezina, he leant against one of his adjutants. His forces pursued the French on their retreat from Russia, though Bibikov was forced eventually to resign due to ill health. He returned to his political duties for a time in St Petersburg, and wrote an account of his father's life and campaigns. He died in 1822 while seeking treatment abroad, and was interred in the Alexander Nevsky Lavra.

== Family and early life ==
Bibikov was born into an ancient dvoryan family on 7 January 1765; the son of the distinguished general Aleksandr Ilyich Bibikov, who had served Empress Elizabeth of Russia, and his wife, Princess Anastasia Semyonovna Kozlovskaya. He was also the nephew of Mikhail Kutuzov, another distinguished military commander. The younger Bibikov was first entered into the books of the Izmaylovsky Regiment as a non-commissioned officer in 1768 at the age of just three, and granted the rank of sergeant that same year. After the elder Bibikov's death on campaign in 1774, the regiment, in recognition of his father's service, promoted the 9-year old Bibikov to ensign in 1774. He transferred to the Preobrazhensky Regiment and by the time he came of age and was actually able to physically join the regiment on 1 January 1787, he already held the rank of captain. He had by this time, on 22 September 1786, entered service with the Empress Catherine's household. Bibikov was part of the Empress's retinue during her 1787 visit to Taurida, and was awarded a gold medal in memory of the visit.

== Russo-Swedish War ==
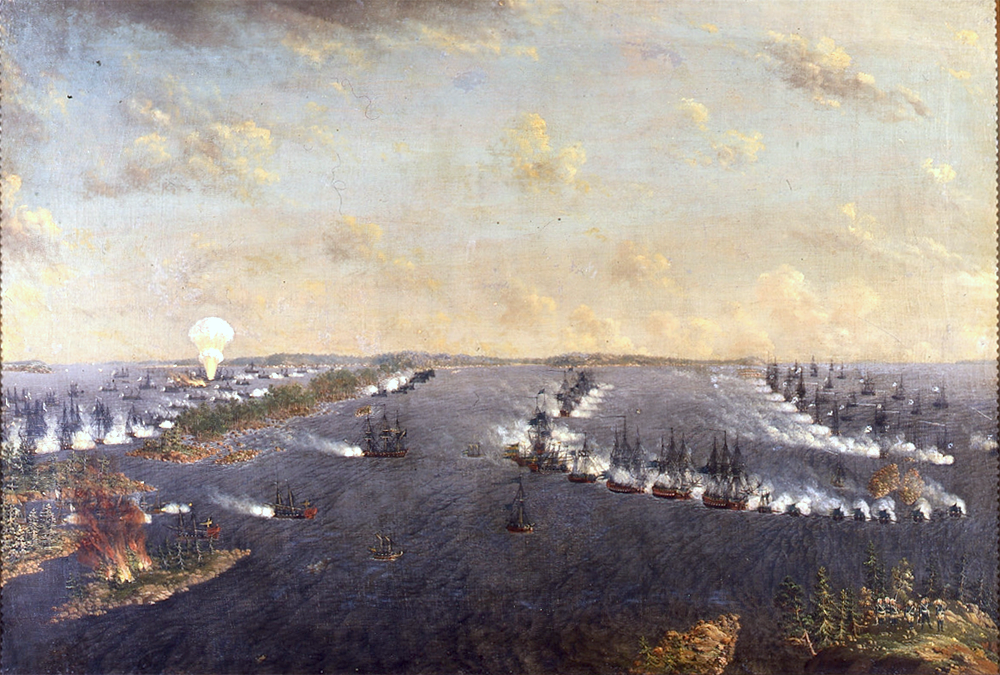
View of the battle of Svensksund on 24 August 1789, by Johan Tietrich Schoultz. The battle, known in Russia as the Battle of Rochensalm, saw Bikikov fighting as part of Vice-Admiral Karl Heinrich von Nassau-Siegen's galley fleet.

With the outbreak of the Russo-Swedish War in 1788, Bibikov volunteered to enter the corps of Lieutenant-General Ivan Michelson, who had served with Bibikov's father and now took the younger Bibikov under his patronage. In the Swedish campaign, Bibikov participated in the reconnaissance of the Swedish outpost at Gokforsky around the village of Kiro, near Wilmanstrand. In a subsequent engagement at the village Bibikov and two grenadiers captured a Swedish cannon. In preliminary operations around Porrassalmi on 1 June 1789, he was wounded in the left leg by a bullet, and in the Battle of Porrassalmi Bibikov commanded a company and was again wounded. For bravery in action he was awarded the Order of St. George Fourth Class on 9 June 1789. He was again in action on 9 July 1789, clashing with Swedish forces as they passed through Kyumen towards Memele, and again at Memele on 29 July. Bibikov then joined the Russian galley fleet, under Vice-Admiral Karl Heinrich von Nassau-Siegen, and distinguished himself at the Battle of Rochensalm in August 1789, and at the disembarkation at the mouth of Kymi on 21 August, where he commanded a battalion of the Preobrazhensky Regiment. For these latter actions he was on 30 August 1789 awarded the ceremonial Golden Sword "For Bravery".

== Civil and diplomatic postings ==
With the conclusion of the war in 1790, Bibikov returned to St. Petersburg and spent the next five years serving with the regiment. In 1795 he entered the civil service and was appointed a Valet de chambre, and then chamberlain on 31 May 1795. With the accession of Paul I as emperor, Bibikov was dispatched on 13 November 1796 to give notice to the Duke of Württemberg. Bibikov was a favourite of the new emperor, who on 1 October 1798 made him one of his secret advisers, and on 7 November 1798 appointed him to the College of Foreign Affairs. Bibikov was then dispatched on various diplomatic duties, serving as Extraordinary Envoy and Plenipotentiary Minister to the Portuguese court from 22 December 1798, and then as extraordinary envoy to the Electorate of Saxony from 1 January 1799. He was recalled on 28 February 1799 and on 7 January 1800 was appointed a herald, and to sit in the Governing Senate with the Order of St. Anna First Class.

From 12 January Bibikov was part of the Provisional Land Survey Department, but left on 1 February 1800. With the calling up of the militias in 1806, during the Napoleonic Wars, Bibikov was on 16 December appointed police chief of Oranienbaum district. He resumed his diplomatic career in 1808, with a posting on 10 February as extraordinary envoy and plenipotentiary minister to the Kingdom of Naples. He was recalled to St. Petersburg on 22 February 1810, and on 20 December 1810 was once more appointed to the Senate, serving in the second branch of the 5th department, and from 8 May 1811 in the first branch of the 3rd department. With Napoleon's invasion of Russia in 1812, Bibikov petitioned his uncle, Field Marshal Mikhail Kutuzov, for a post, and was given command of a detachment of the St. Petersburg militia. Bibikov now commanded a force of 5,575 people, including 4,000 militiamen, supplemented with the attachment of two squadrons of the Grodno hussars and the Polish Uhlan regiment. Bibikov and his force left St. Petersburg on 3 September, uniting with Peter Wittgenstein's army on 28 September. Wittgenstein then placed Bibikov in command of the entire St. Petersburg and Novgorod militias.

== Action in the Napoleonic Wars ==
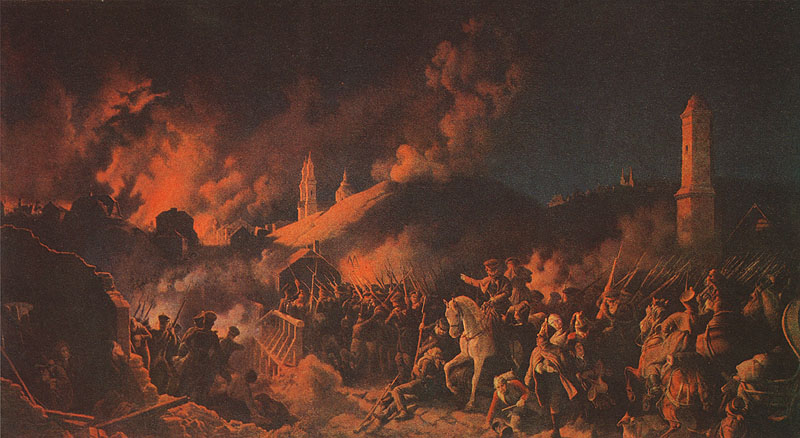
The Battle of Polotsk, by Peter von Hess. Bibikov and his militia played a key role in storming the city.

Bibikov and his militia went into action on 6 October 1812 took part in the Second Battle of Polotsk. The militia took the lead in storming the city, and were the first troops to enter it. For his service at the battle he was later awarded the Order of St. George Third Class on 3 January 1813. With the combining of Wittgenstein's force with Fabian Steinheil's Bibikov was given command over the front line of the army, consisting of the Perm, Sevsk and Kaluga infantry regiments, chasseurs and cavalry squadrons, and 30 cannon. Bibikov and his men fought at Battle of Chashniki on 31 October 1812, and at Battle of Smoliani on 13–14 November. At Smoliani Bibikov was wounded in the leg by a bullet, but remained on the battlefield until the end. He went on to see action at the Battle of Borisov, and at the Battle of Berezina from 26 to 29 November 1812. Unable to walk or ride because of his wound, he commanded the battle while being moved around on a sleigh; when the team of horses pulling the sleigh were killed, he supported himself by leaning on the shoulder of an adjutant.

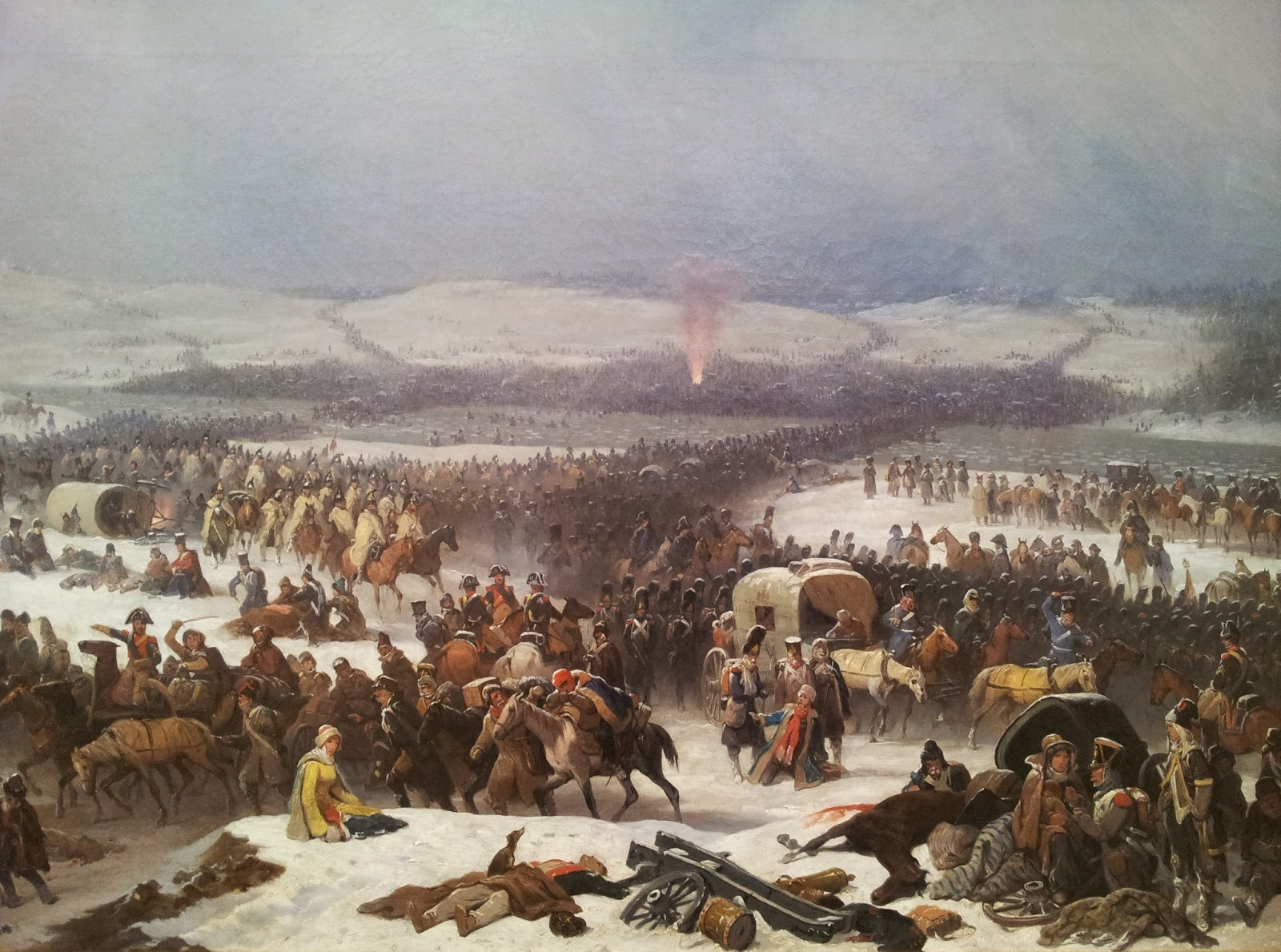
Napoleon's crossing of the Berezina, a 1866 painting by January Suchodolski. Wounded in an earlier engagement, Bibikov fought the battle from a sleigh.

In December Bibikov and his forces, pursuing the retreating French, entered Prussia. His militia had suffered heavily during the campaign, with only 900 surviving from his original force of 12,000. They nevertheless fought at Pitkonen and Labiau, and at the occupation of Königsberg. Bibikov then asked Wittgenstein for permission to stay at Königsberg to reorganise his severely reduced forces. While resting at Königsberg his forces presented him with a golden sword with the inscriptions "For faith and the Tsar", and "To Senator Bibikov, from the St. Petersburg militia". After reorganising his forces, Bibikov advanced his men to Pillau, and on 6 February 1813 joined the forces besieging Danzig. Here Bibikov fell ill and was forced to return to Königsberg for a period to recuperate. He rejoined the siege on 16 June and was assigned to command the Kaluga militia. He carried out a restructuring of the militia, before gaining permission on 10 July to resign on health grounds. As a mark of favour for his service, Emperor Alexander I gave permission for Bibikov to continue to wear his militia general's uniform. Bibikov took a leave of absence from the Senate on 15 October 1813, returning to St. Petersburg for a period, before resuming his post in the first branch of the 3rd Department of the Senate. During this time he wrote a history of his father's service in Pugachev's Rebellion, Notes on the Life and Service of Alexander Ilyich Bibikov, which was published in St. Petersburg in 1817. Bibikov's portrait was one of those painted by the studio of George Dawe for display in the Military Gallery of the Winter Palace, to commemorate the important generals and military leaders of the war with France.

== Later life ==
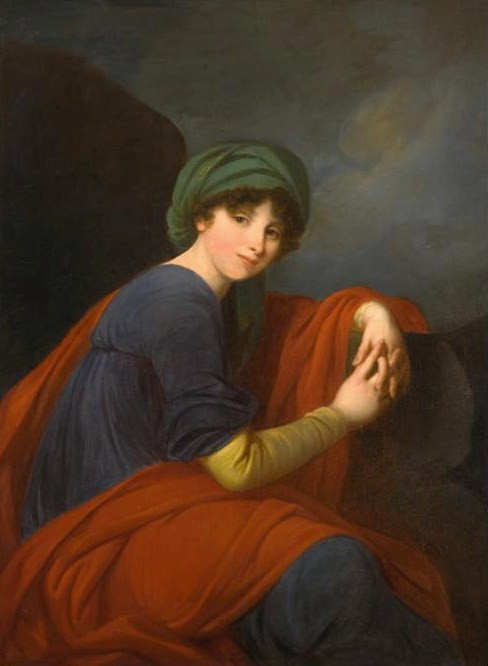
Bibikov's wife, Anna Vasilyevna, in a portrait by Élisabeth Vigée Le Brun

Bibikov left St. Petersburg on 25 April 1821 to seek treatment at the spa town of Carlsbad, and died while abroad, on 1 August 1822 at Dresden. His body was returned to St Petersburg to be buried in the Lazarevskoe Cemetery of the Alexander Nevsky Lavra. He had married Anna Vasilyevna Khanykova, the daughter of State Counselor Vasily Klimovich Khanykov. Anna Vasilyevna survived her husband for four years, and was buried next to him in the Alexander Nevsky Lavra. The couple had three children together, their eldest son Vasily (1793–1867) also served in the army during the war of 1812, later reaching the rank of major general. They also had a second son, Aleksandr, who believed to be in romantic relationship with Maria Gartung, the older daughter of Alexander Pushkin, and a daughter, Aleksandra, who married Major-General N. M. Bezobrazovsky.
