= Fyodor Rokotov =

Russian painter

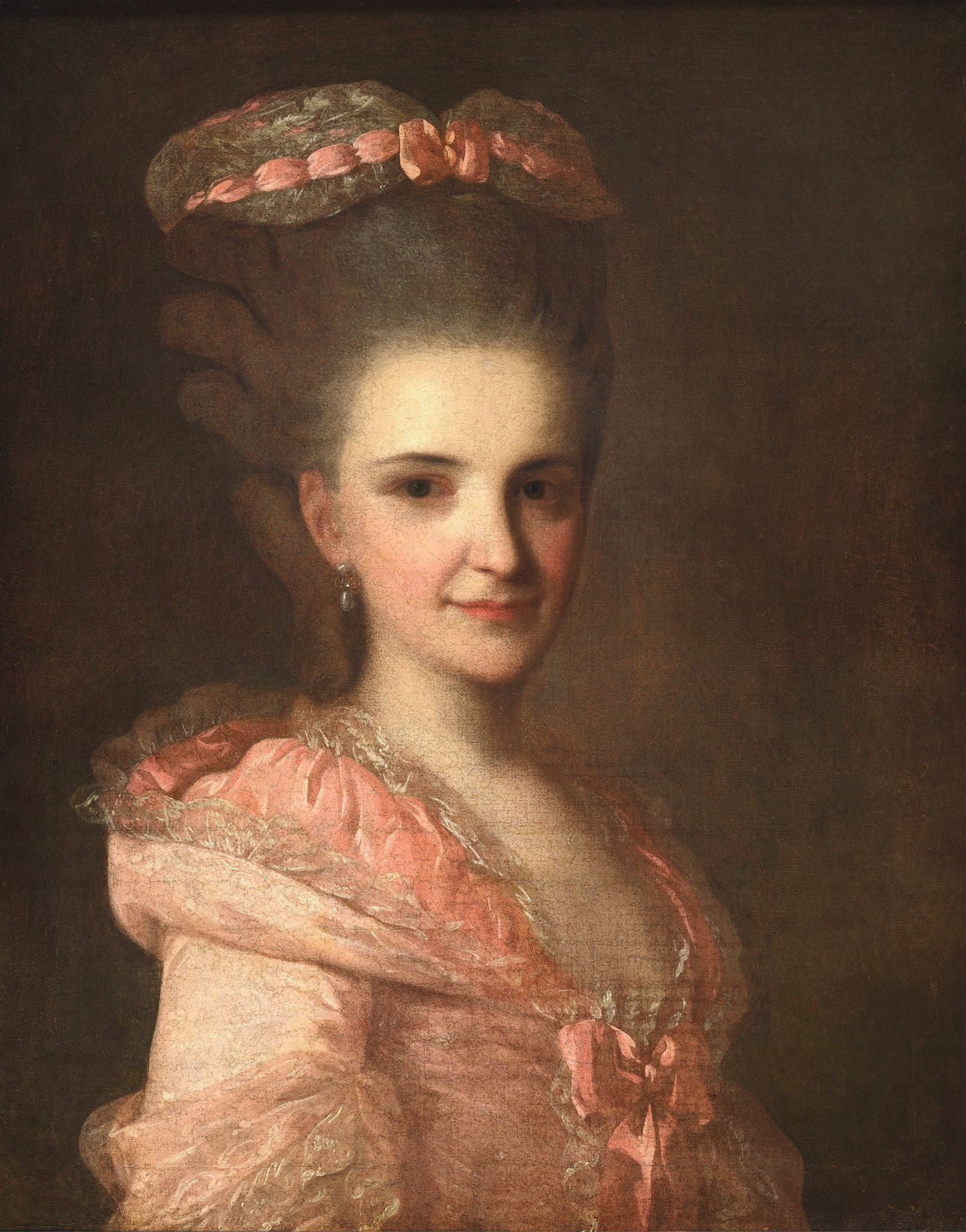
Lady in a Pink Dress, 1770s

Fyodor Stepanovich Rokotov (Fedor Rokotov) (Russian: Фёдор Степа́нович Ро́котов; 1736 – December 24, 1808) was a Russian painter who specialized in portraits.

Fyodor Rokotov was born in Vorotsovo (now a part of the Obruchevsky District of Moscow) into a family of peasant serfs, belonging to the Repnins. Much in his biography is obscure. He studied art in Saint Petersburg Academy of Arts. After buying back his freedom at the end of the 1750s he became established as a fashionable painter.

In 1765, Rokotov was elected an Academician, but he did not work as a professor in the Academy long, because it interfered with his painting. He returned to Moscow in 1765, where he lived for the rest of his life. He had a lot of commissions there, becoming one of the best portrait painters of his time.

Among his best-known portraits are Portrait of Alexandra Struyskaya (1772), sometimes called the Russian Mona Lisa and admittedly the most celebrated piece of the 18th-century Russian painting; Portrait of Countess Elisabeth Santi (1785), and Lady in a Pink Dress (1770s, illustration, right).

Rokotov avoided painting formal portraits with much adornment and decoration. Instead he was one of the first Russian painters advancing a psychological portrait with attention to optical and atmospheric effects.

== Selected works ==
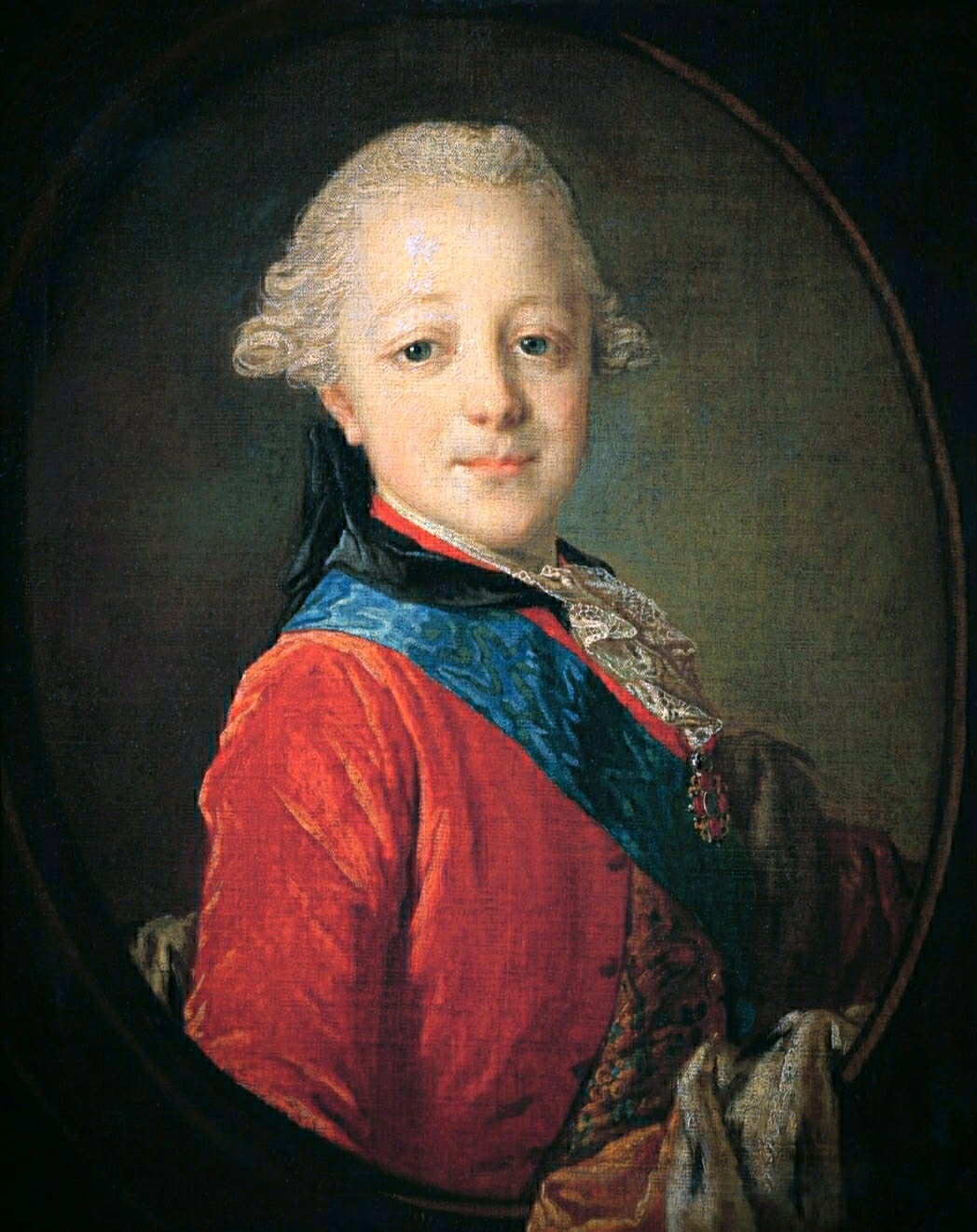
Emperor Paul I as a Child. 1761

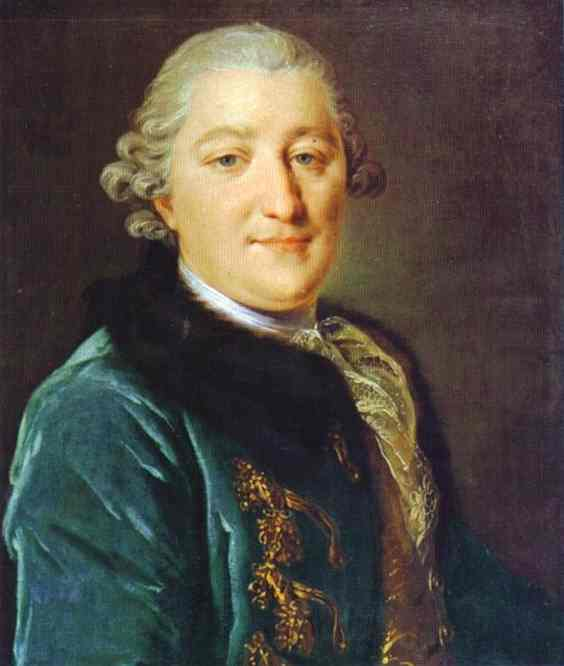
Count I. G. Orlov. c.1762-1765

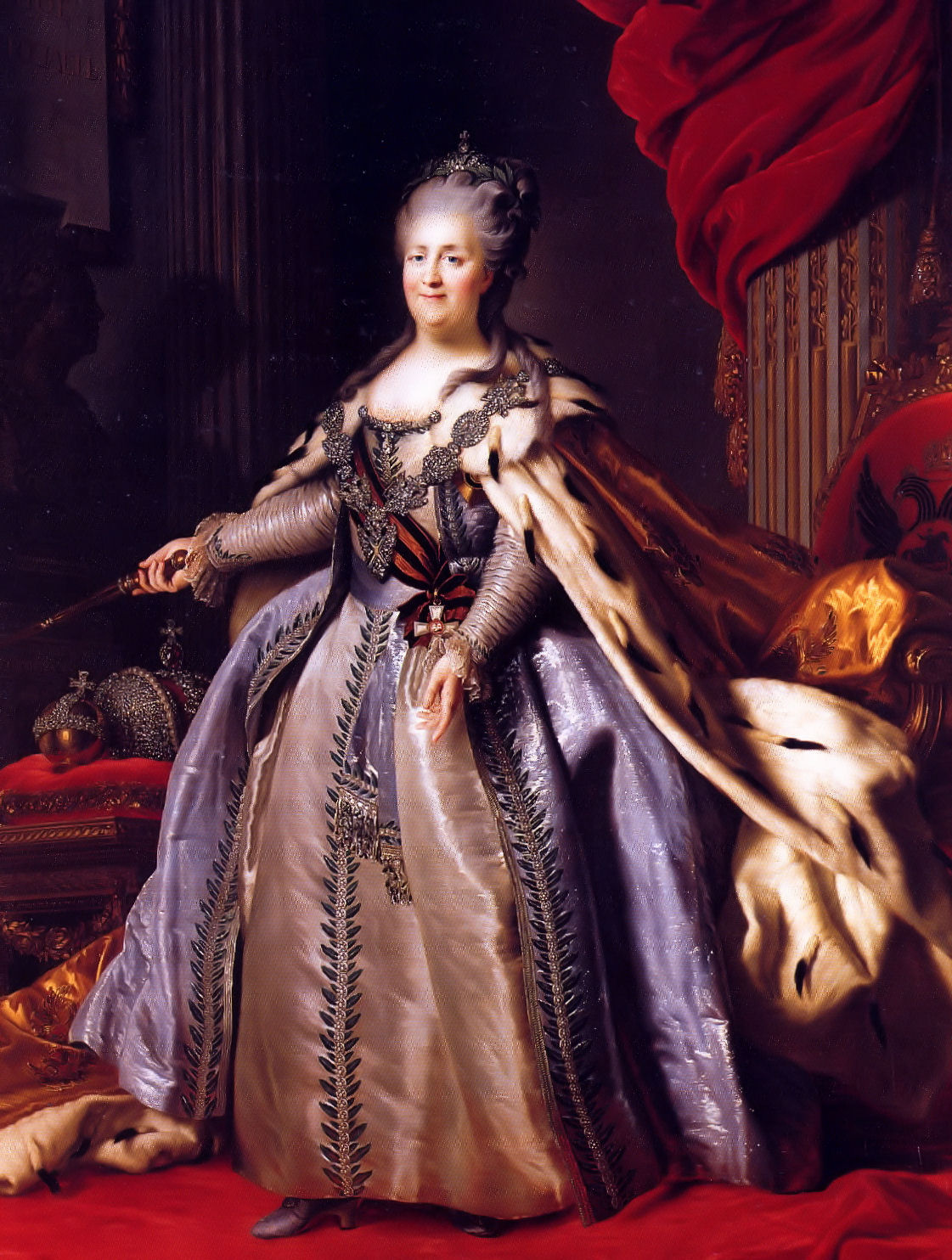
Catherine II, 1770

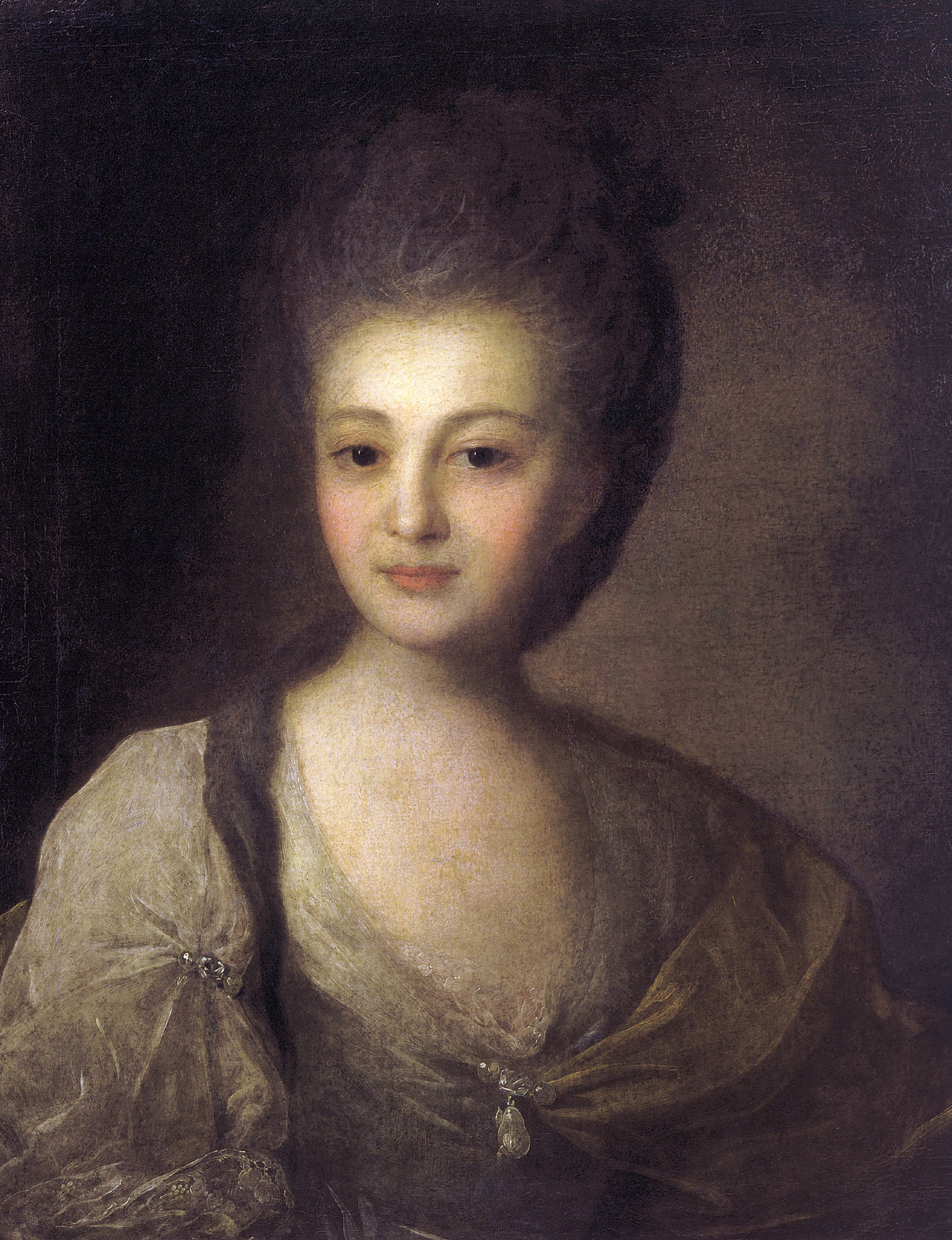
Alexandra Struyskaya. 1772

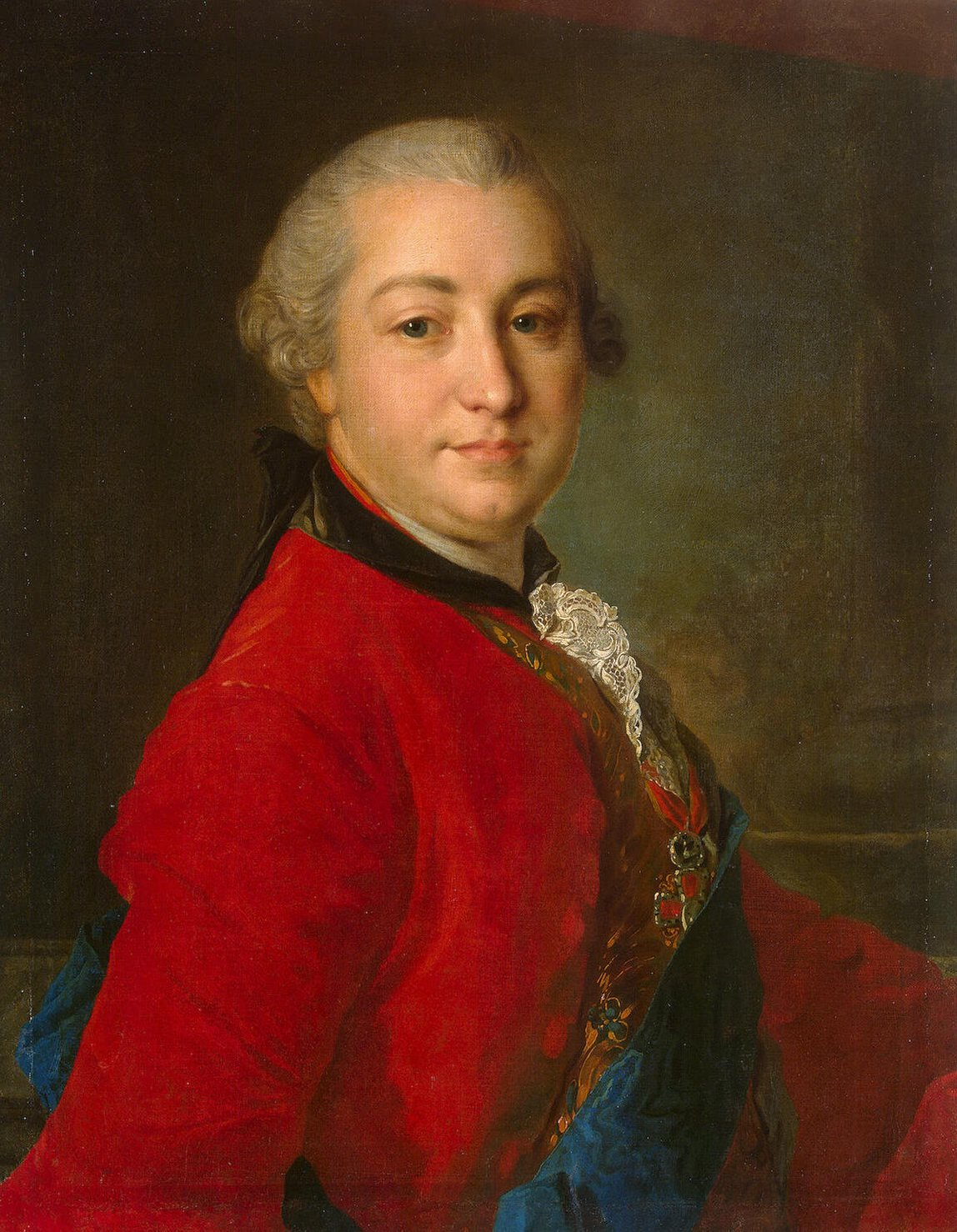
Ivan Shuvalov 1760

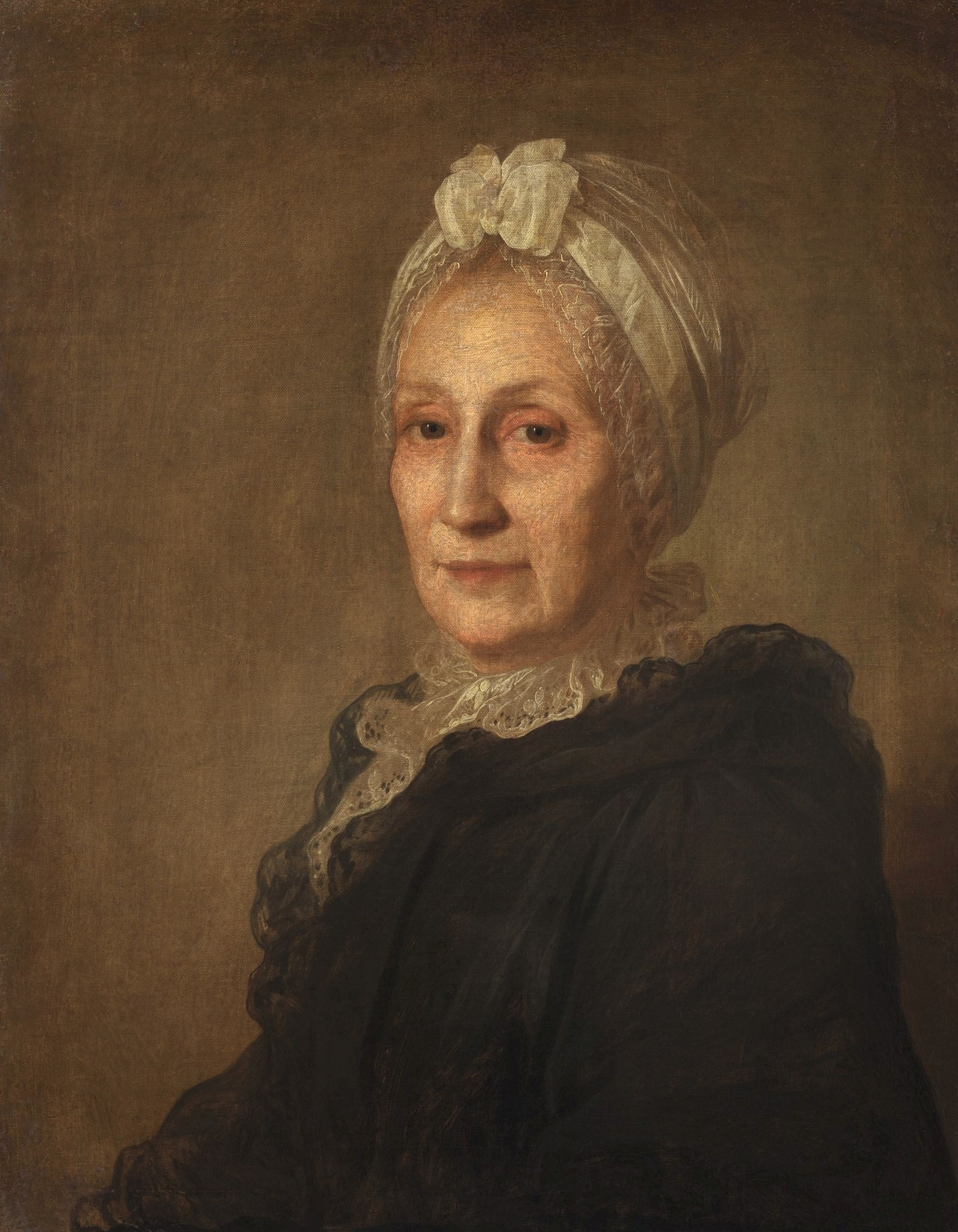
Anna Yuryevna Kvashnina-Samarina. 1770s

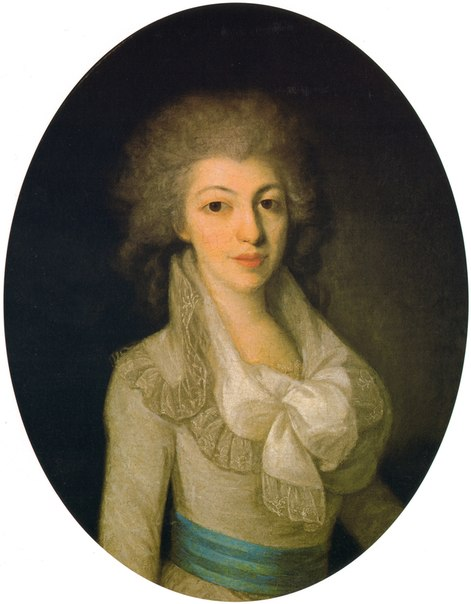
Princess Darya Gruzinskaya, late 1700s

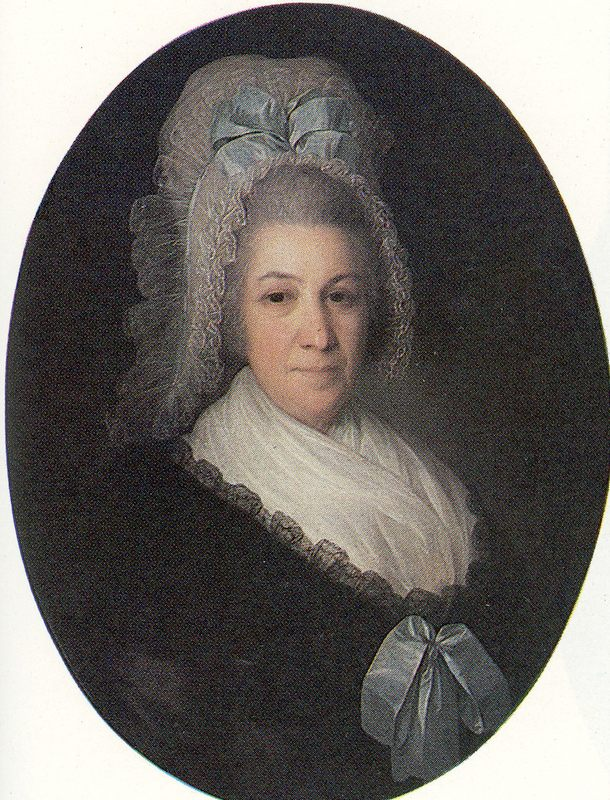
Lady in a White Cap. 1790s

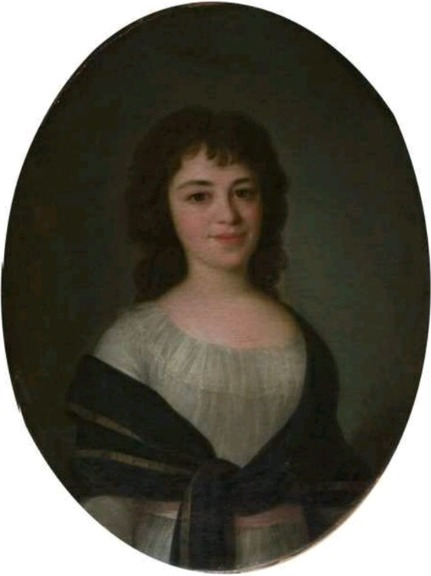
Countess Anna Buturlina, c. 1793.

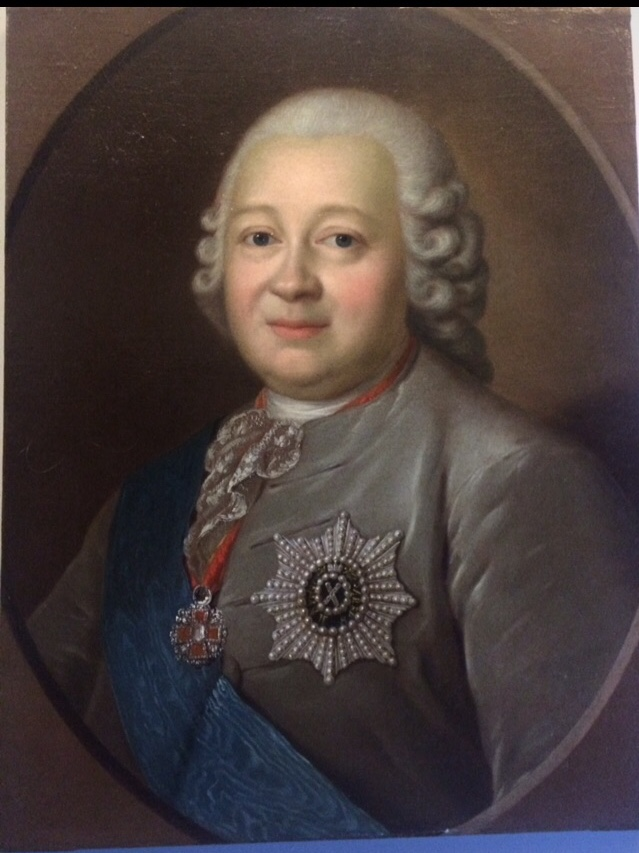
Nikita Ivanovich Panin,1760s

== See also ==
- List of Russian artists
