= Vorontsov (surname) =

Vorontsov (Russian: Воронцов), feminine form Vorontsova (Russian: Воронцова), is a Russian surname that belongs to the Vorontsov Russian noble family. Notable people with the surname include:

- Alexander Vorontsov (1741–1805), Chancellor of the Russian Empire
- Boris Vorontsov-Velyaminov (1904–1994), Russian astrophysicist
- Illarion Vorontsov-Dashkov (1837–1916), Russian politician and army general
- Mikhail Illarionovich Vorontsov (1714–1767), Russian statesman and diplomat
- Mikhail Semyonovich Vorontsov (1782–1856), Russian nobleman and field-marshal
- Semyon Vorontsov (1744–1832), Russian diplomat
- Vasily Vorontsov (1847–1917), Russian economist and sociologist
- Yekaterina Vorontsova-Dashkova (1744–1810), Russian noblewoman
- Yuli Vorontsov (1929–2007), Russian diplomat
- Yuri Vorontsov (1937–2002), Russian cinematographer

== See also ==
- Vorontsov (disambiguation)
