= Roman Vorontsov =

Russian politician

Roman Illarionovich Vorontsov
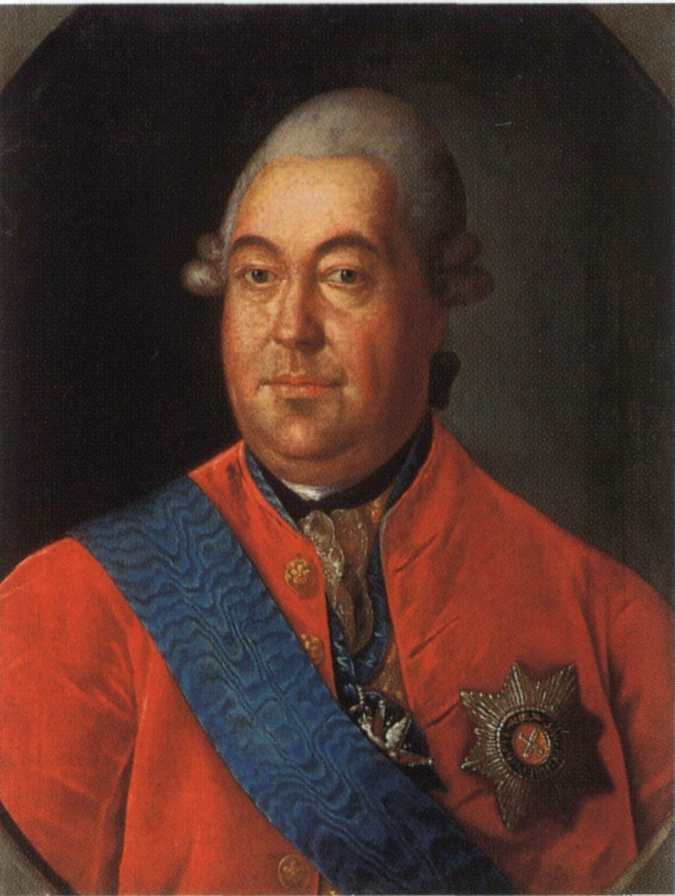
- Born: July 28, 1717
- Died: December 11, 1783 (aged 66); Vladimir, Vladimir Province
- Occupations: Senator, Governor General
- Children: Ekaterina Dashkova; Alexander Vorontsov; Elizabeth Vorontsova; Semyon Vorontsov
- Parents: Illarion Vorontsov (father); Anna Maslova (mother)
- Awards: Order of the Holy Apostle Andrew the First-Called; Order of Saint Vladimir; Order of Saint Alexander Nevsky; Order of Saint Anna; Order of the White Eagle

Count (1760) Roman Illarionovich (Larionovich) Vorontsov (1717–1783) was a Full Chamberlain (1746), General-Chef (1761), Senator (1760), Vladimir, Penza and Tambov Governor-General (1778–1783), one of the first figures of Russian Freemasonry. Brother of Chancellor Mikhail Vorontsov and Ivan Vorontsov. He was the owner of the estate Andreevskoe.

== Biography ==
The middle son of Illarion Vorontsov from his marriage with Anna Maslova. In his youth, Roman Vorontsov served (1733) in the Life Guards Izmailovsky Regiment, in the 1730s, he supported the crown princess Elizaveta Petrovna, took part in the coup on November 25, 1741 (he took away members of the Braunschweig family from Saint Petersburg).

At the time of the formation of the Russian Academy, became its member. In 1748, he was awarded the Order of Saint Anna; September 5, 1751 – the Order of Saint Alexander Nevsky, in 1783 – the Order of the Holy Prince Vladimir, 1st class. During the reign of Elizabeth Petrovna, Roman Vorontsov became one of the richest people in Russia, the owner of estates and factories.

With the diploma of the Roman Emperor Franz I (dated January 19, 1760), the real chamberlain, Lieutenant-General Roman Vorontsov, together with his brother, the real chamberlain Ivan Vorontsov, was promoted with descending descendants into the "Count of the Roman Empire dignity".

In 1760, Vorontsov became a member of the Legislative Commission, in which, like the Commission on the Rights of the Nobility (1763), he advocated the legislative formalization of class rights of the nobility, including the right to exclusive ownership of serfs.

With the advent of Peter III Fedorovich, his position at court was strengthened, since his daughter Elizaveta Romanovna was the favorite of the new emperor; on January 8, 1762, Roman Vorontsov received the rank of General-Chef.

Under the reign of Catherine II, he was first in disgrace, was even arrested and deported to Moscow, deprived of a number of estates in Little Russia. New appointments and career Vorontsov was obliged to popular unrest. Pugachevschina revealed many of the shortcomings of the provincial government of the empire. An attempt to rectify the situation was the reform of 1775, according to which 50 provinces were created instead of 23 provinces. The provincial administration was headed by the governor or governor-general, who controlled two or three provinces. The viceroy was given great rights.

In March 1778, by decree of Catherine II, Vladimir Governorship was formed, in 1779 – Tambov Governorship, and in 1780 – Penza Governorship. The first Vladimir, Penza and Tambov governor and governor general was Roman Vorontsov. With his requisitions and extortion, he brought the provinces entrusted to him to the utter ruin, for which he received the nickname "Roman – big pocket".

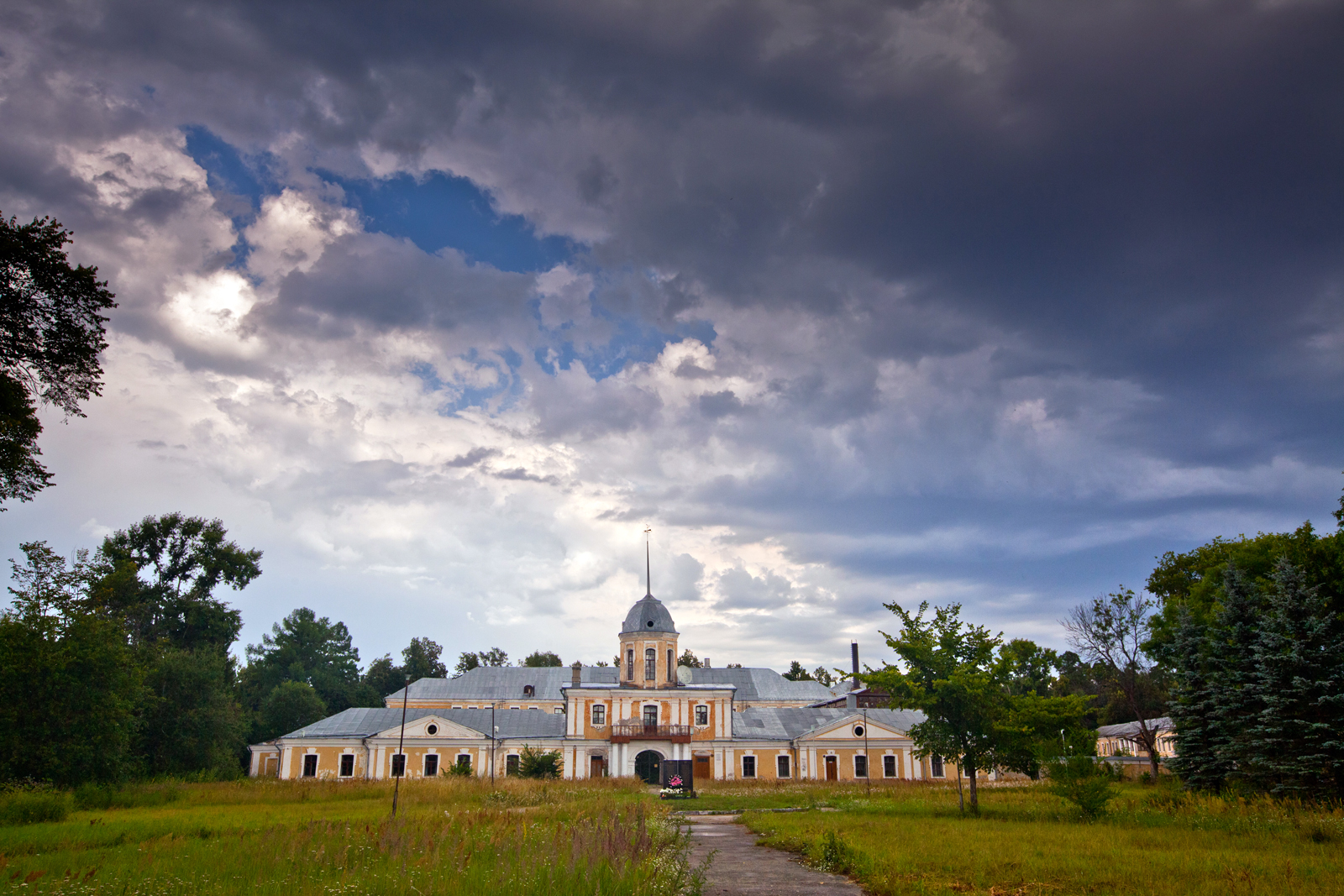
The estate of Roman Vorontsov "Andreevskoye" (Petushinsky District of Vladimir Oblast)

The historian Prince Mikhail Shcherbatov wrote about him:

Count Roman Larionovich Vorontsov, throughout his life recognized as a bribe taker, was appointed governor of Vladimir and did not cease to make ordinary bribes.

It came to the point that Catherine sent him a gift with a hint – a big wallet, which arrived just on his name day and, they say, acted upon him so much that he soon became ill and died on December 11, 1783.

On the other hand, the expression "big pocket" could have arisen as a result of Count Vorontsov's activities in the Free Economic Society. In his printed articles, he pointed out ways to mitigate the morals of the peasantry, and, referring to his own example, suggested that the landowners organize annual grain stocks in the villages in case of crop failure. The insistent advice of Count Roman Vorontsov to stock up on products fully justifies the nickname "big pocket".

By a registered Higher Decree of April 16, 1797, it was ordered "to introduce the clans of the Roman Empire of the Counts Vorontsov among the clans of the counts of the Russian Empire".

He was buried in the Dmitrievsky Cathedral in Vladimir.

== Family ==
He was married since 1736 to a rich merchant's daughter, Martha Surmina, who died of typhus at the age of 26 and left five children orphaned. Widowed, Roman Vorontsov had no desire to engage in family affairs and raising children. The empress made two elder daughters the maids of honor and took her to the palace, the sons lived with the eldest count Vorontsov-grandfather, the youngest daughter Catherine was raised with her only daughter, uncle Mikhail Vorontsov.

- Maria Romanovna (1737 – April 21, 1779) – maid of honor, was married since 1757 to Count Peter Alexandrovich Buturlin (1731–1787). She died in Saint Petersburg from consumption. Their son Dmitry, was the director of the Hermitage; daughter Elizabeth was married to Senator Adrian Divov.
- Elizaveta Romanovna (1739 – 1792) – maid of honor, favorite of Peter III, was married to state adviser Alexander Ivanovich Polyansky (1721–1818).
- Alexander Romanovich (1741 – 1805) – statesman of the Catherine and Alexander reigns.
- Ekaterina Romanovna (1743 – 1810) – participated in the coup of Catherine II, gained great fame under the name of Princess Dashkova.
- Semyon Romanovich (1744 – 1832) – Russian envoy to the Great Britain.

Roman Vorontsov also had children born after he was widowed – from the Englishwoman Elizabeth Brocket, who received the name Rontsov (Rantsov). These children "enjoyed the special tenderness of their parent, so that they spent his fortune".

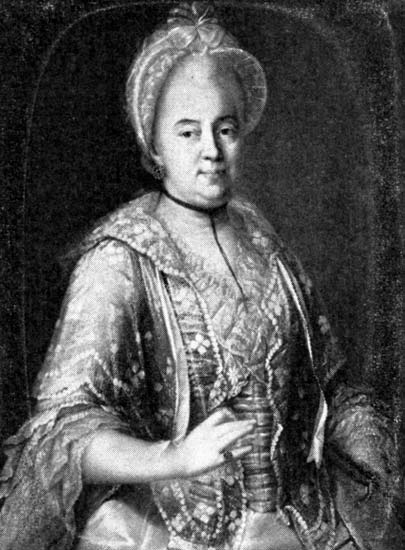
Wife Marfa

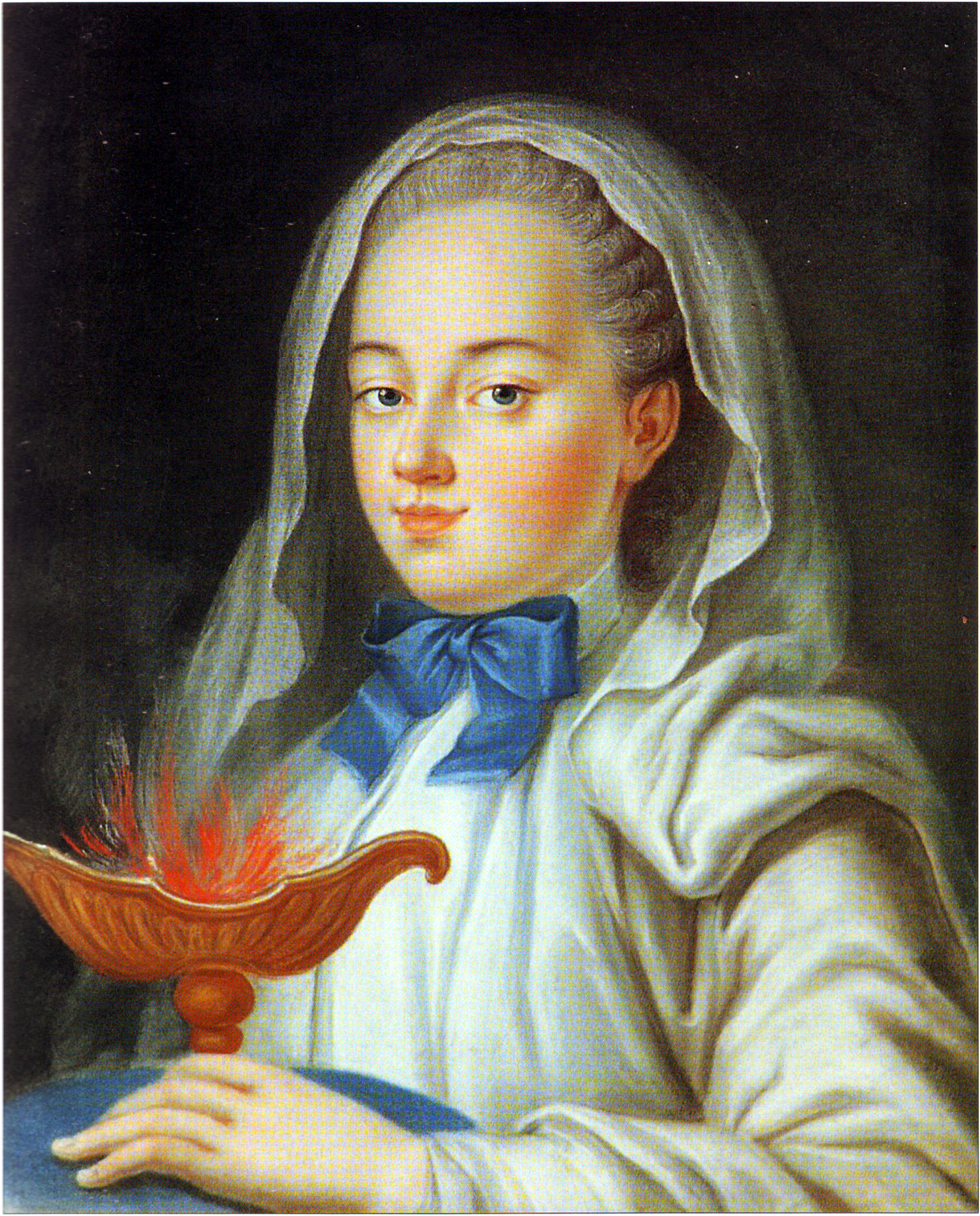
Maria

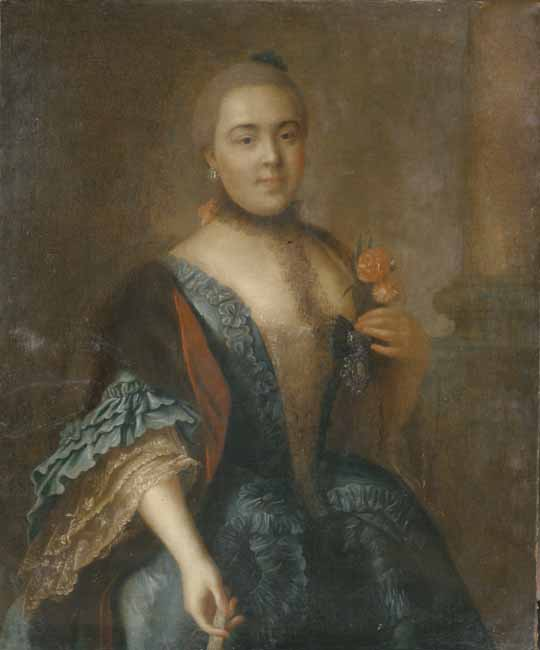
Elizabeth

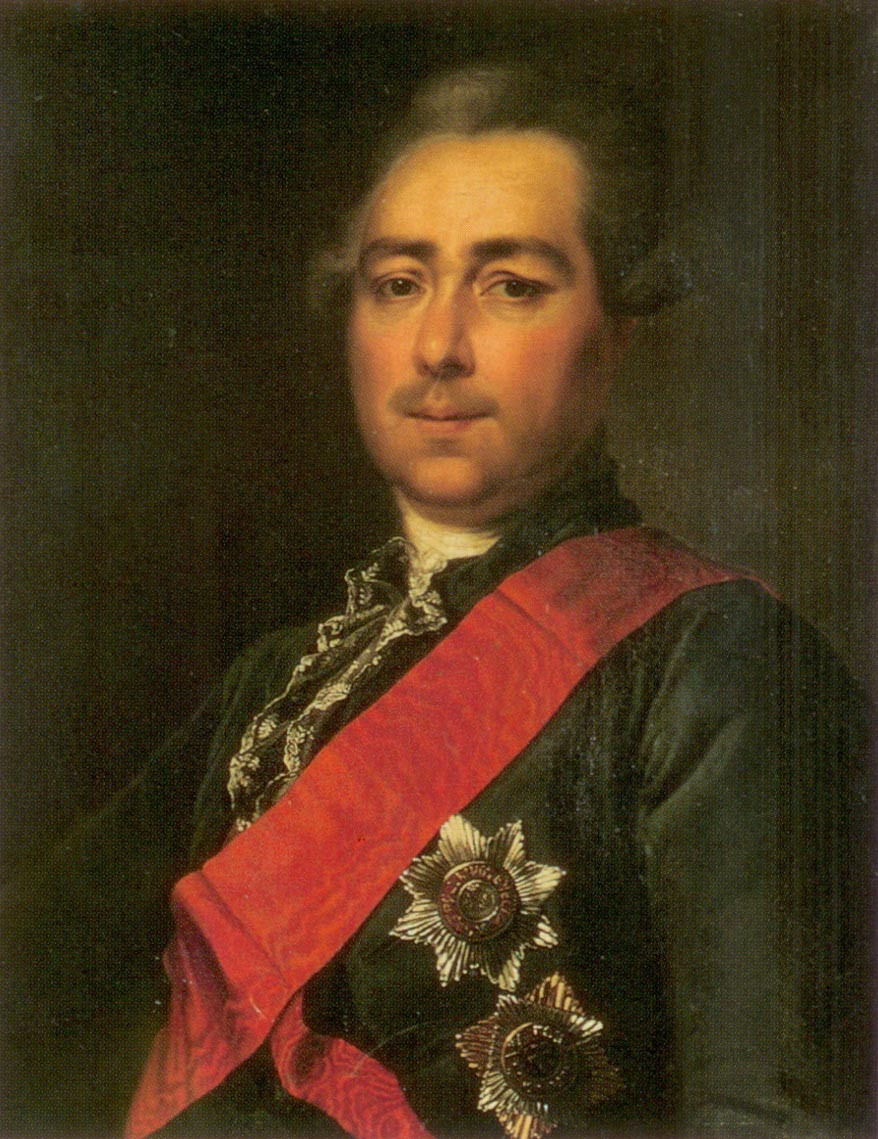
Alexander

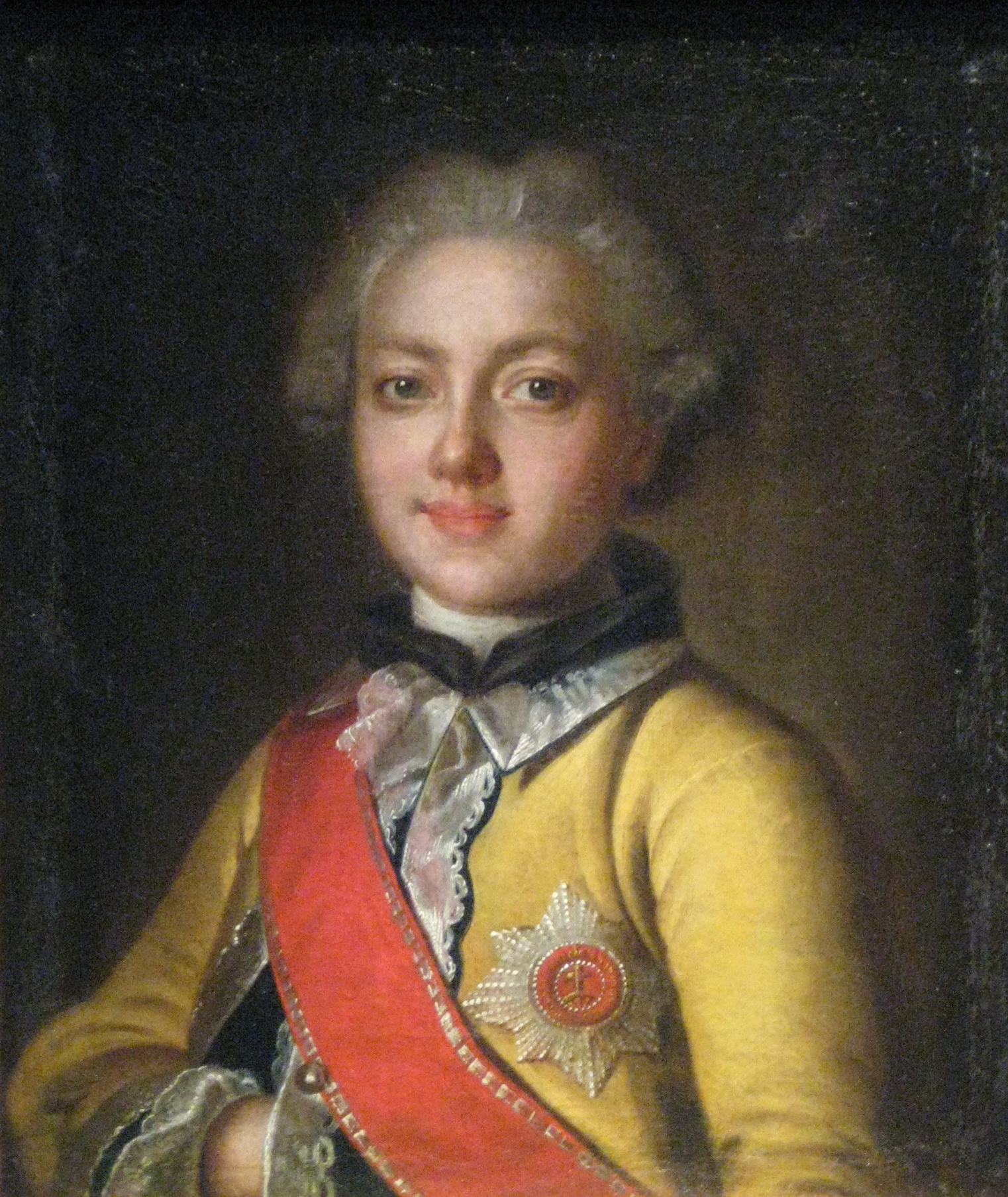
Ekaterina

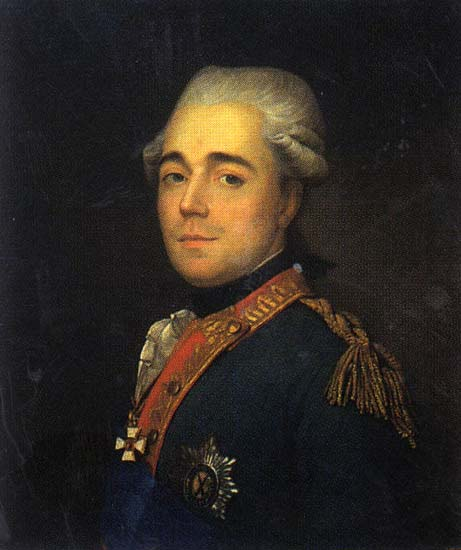
Semen

== Sources ==
- Vitold Rummel. Vorontsovs // Brockhaus and Efron Encyclopedic Dictionary: in 86 Volumes (82 Volumes and 4 Additional) – Saint Petersburg, 1890–1907
- Vladimir Alekseev. Count Roman Illarionovich Vorontsov // Questions of History. No. 4. 2009. Pages 144–148
