= Vorontsov Palace =

The Vorontsov Palace may refer to:

- Vorontsov Palace (Alupka) in Alupka, Crimea, Ukraine
- Vorontsov Palace (Odesa) in Odesa, Ukraine
- Vorontsov Palace (Saint Petersburg) in Saint Petersburg, Russia

== See also ==
- Vorontsov
- Vorontsov (disambiguation)
