= Vorontsov (disambiguation) =

Vorontsov is a Russian noble family.

- Vorontsov (surname)
- Vorontsov Lighthouse, in the Black Sea port of Odesa, Ukraine
- Vorontsov Palace (disambiguation)
- Vorontsov Cave, occasional reference to the Vorontsovskaya/Vorontsovka Cave of the Vorontsovka Caves system

== See also ==
- Woronzow Records, a record label that publishes Ptolemaic Terrascope
