= Mikhail Vorontsov =

Mikhail Vorontsov may refer to:

- Mikhail Semyonovich Vorontsov (1782—1856), Russian prince, field-marshal, statesman
- Mikhail Illarionovich Vorontsov (1714—1767), Russian count, statesman, diplomat
