= Russian Academy (disambiguation) =

The Russian Academy was an institution for research in Russian language and literature in the Russian Empire.

Russian Academy may also refer to:

- Russian Academy of Sciences
- Russian Academy of Arts
- Russian Academy of Music
- Russian Academy of Fine Arts
- Russian Academy of Theatre Arts
- Russian Academy of Medical Sciences
