= Yakov Smirnov (diplomat) =

18th and 19th-century Russian Orthodox priest and diplomat

The Reverend Yakov Smirnov
- Яков Иванович Смирнов
- Born: Yakov Ivanovich Linitsky; 1754; Kharkov Governorate, Russian Empire
- Died: 16 April 1840 (aged 85–86); London, UK
- Occupations: Cleric; diplomat
- Children: Konstantin, Elizabeth, Sophia, John, Catherine
- Parent: Ivan Linitsky
- Religion: Christianity (Eastern Orthodox)
- Church: Russian Orthodox Church
- Offices held: archpriest, dean of the Russian Embassy church in London

Yakov Ivanovich Smirnov (Note: Russian: Яков Иванович Смирнов.) (Russian: Яков Иванович Смирнов; born Linitsky; 1754 –28 April [O.S. 16 April] 1840), also known in Britain as James Smirnove, was a Russian Orthodox priest and diplomat who served in London for 60 years.

== Life ==
Born in a priest's family in Kharkov in 1754. His surname at birth was Linitsky, Smirnov being a translation of the original name, supposedly derived from the Latin word for "quiet" into Russian. After studies in Kharkov and England he was posted as the priest of the Russian Embassy Church in London in 1780 and remained in this position until 1837, when he retired due to poor health. Besides his duties as priest, he was involved in almost all the activities of the Embassy: he took care of the Russian students studying in Britain and even paid their fees, helped the Ambassador Semyon Vorontsov to compile the diplomatic dispatches and gathered valuable information. Smirnov was a polymath who had a deep interest in many branches of science and agriculture and made sure the British achievements were known in Russia. He made sure the Russian Academy of Sciences was subscribed to new British scientific works and arranged for William Herschel's telescope to be shipped to St. Petersburg. Smirnov was a friend of Jeremy Bentham and helped the Venezuelan patriot Francisco de Miranda during the latter's stay in London. Smirnov introduced Vorontsov to the industrialist Matthew Boulton When the Russian Emperor Paul I struck an alliance with France, the relations with Britain worsened. In 1800 Smirnov was appointed as Russian Chargé d’Affaires, as the only member of Embassy staff left in London after the departure of the previous Charge d’Affaires Lizakevich, and served in this capacity until 1801. This appointment of a priest as head of an embassy was a unique case in Russian diplomatic history. Though Smirnov carried out his diplomatic duties and maintained contact with the Foreign Office, he never received and presented letters of credence and was only recognized as de facto envoy. Between 1807 and 1812, while state of war was declared between Russia and Britain, he took care of the Russian community in London and of the Embassy assets and papers, once again acting as Russia's diplomatic representative in London. In December 1812, after the French invasion of Russia, Smirnov transferred the keys of the Embassy to the new Ambassador, Prince Christoph von Lieven.

== Awards ==
Smirnov was ennobled in 1804, awarded Russian orders of St. Anne (2nd class) and St. John of Jerusalem, as well as a special cross for clergy in memory of the 1812 War and a diamond ring as gift of Emperor Alexander I.

== Family ==
Yakov Ivanovich had three brothers (two of whom were ennobled for their services) and several sisters. Little is known about his wife, even the year of marriage and her death date are unknown. Yakov Smirnov had 5 children: Konstantin (1782–184?), Elizabeth (1788–1869), Sophia (1791–1852), John (Ivan) (1794–1842), Catherine (1798–1872). John became a Russian diplomat, in 1825–32 he served in London and was elected Fellow of the Royal Society. In 1836–1842 he was Russian Consul General in Genoa and is buried there. The three daughters remained single, lived in London and were buried in Kensal Green Cemetery with their father.

== Memory ==
The monument on Smirnov's grave in Kensal Green Cemetery was restored in 2012 with a donation of the Russian Embassy and individual contributions from Embassy staff and the Russian community. Flowers are laid annually on 10 February (Russian Diplomats Day). The archpriest features in Valentin Pikul's short story "Old quills", which deals with the successful public opinion campaign carried out by the Russian Embassy during the Ochakov crisis. No portrait of James Smirnove survives.

== Literature ==
- A. G. Cross, "Yakov Smirnov: A Russian Priest of Many Parts," Oxford Slavonic Papers, new ser., 8 [1975] P. 37–52.
