= Pavel Dashkov =

Russian engineer (1763–1807)

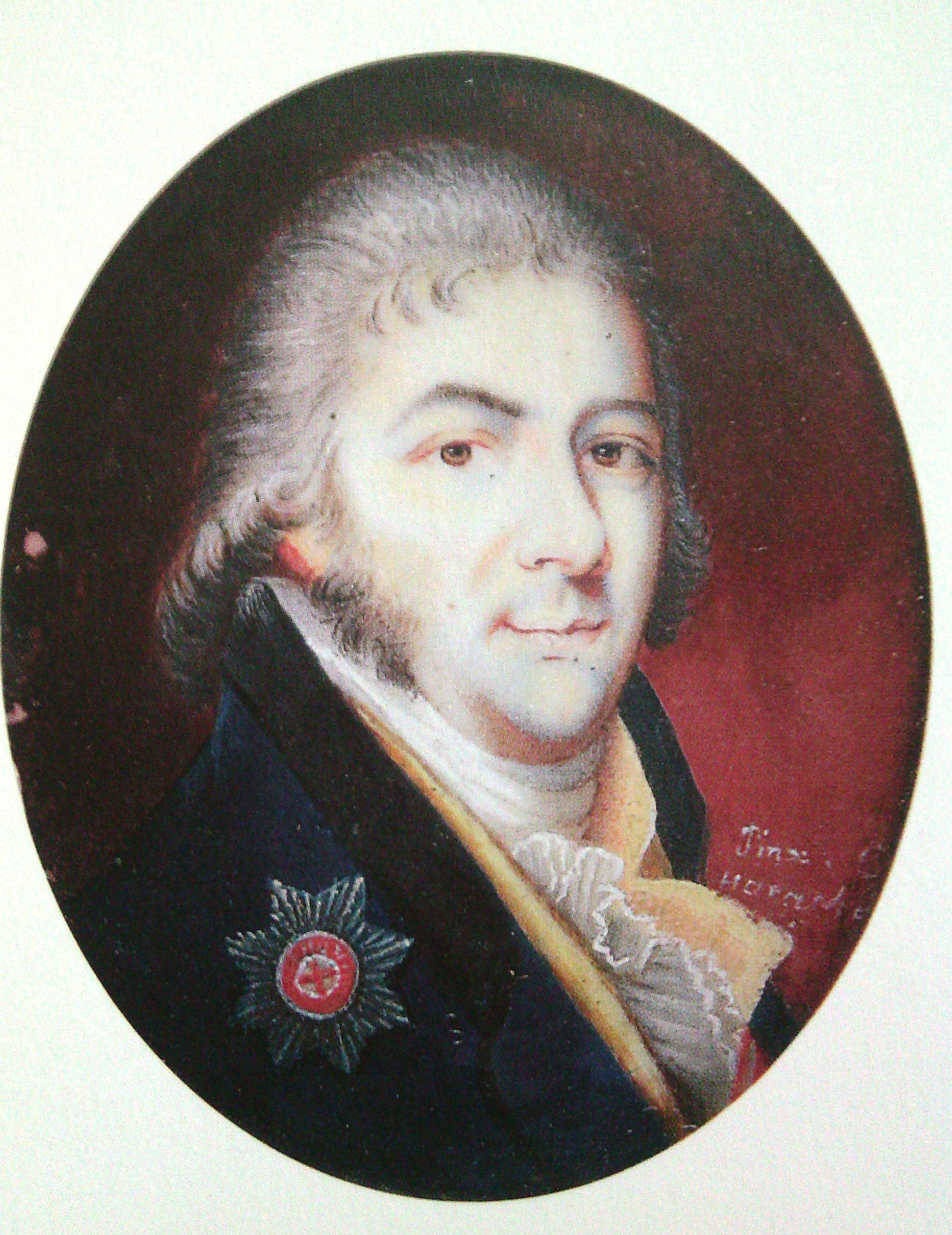
1800s painting

Prince Pavel Mikhailovich Dashkov FRS (12 May 1763 – 1807) was a Russian engineer.

== Life ==
He was the son of Yekaterina Romanovna Vorontsova-Dashkova and Mikhail Ivanovich Dashkov (1736–1764). He was educated at the University of Edinburgh, from 1777 to 1779, graduating with an MA. He was on Grigory Potyomkin's staff with Korsakov. He was elected Fellow of the Royal Society on 8 February 1781.

== Freemasonry ==
Dashkov was a Scottish Freemason. He was Initiated in Lodge Canongate Kilwinning, No. 2, on 13 May 1779. He is recorded as 'Paul [Pavel], His Highness, Prince of Dashkov.'

== Works ==
- Dissertatio philosophica inauguralis, de tragoedia. Paulus Daschkovie princeps, 1779
