= Elizaveta Vorontsova =

Russian noblewoman and lady-in-waiting

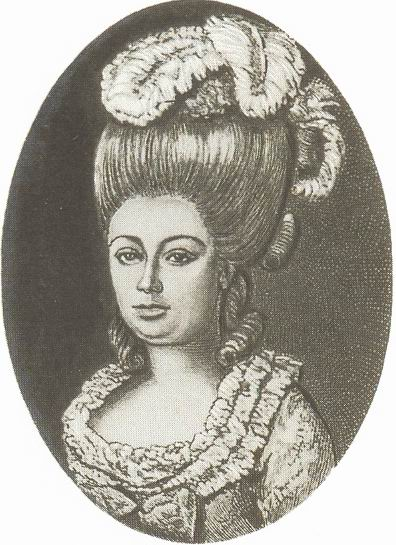
A contemporary, the agronomist Andrei Bolotov, described Elizaveta Vorontsova as a "fat and uncouth" person with "a bloated mug".

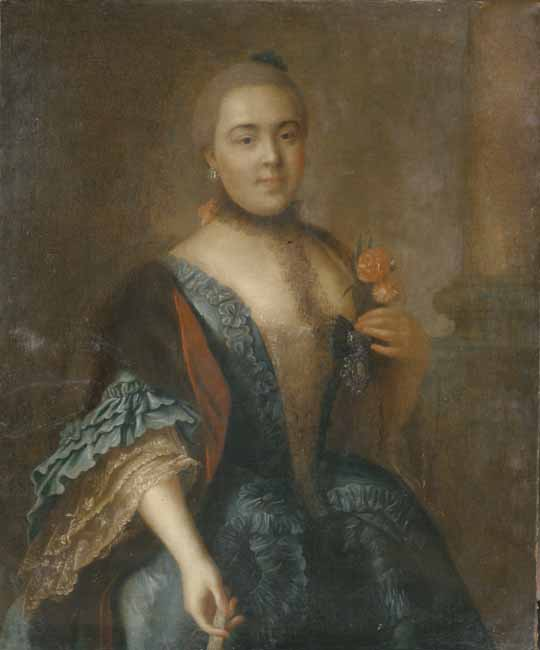
A portrait by Aleksey Antropov. The sitter is sometimes identified as Elizaveta Vorontsova.

Countess Elizaveta Romanovna Vorontsova (Russian: Елизавета Романовна Воронцова; 13 August 1739 – 2 February 1792) was a Russian noblewoman and lady-in-waiting. She was a mistress of Emperor Peter III of Russia (reigned February to July 1762). During their affair, rumors suggested that Peter had intentions of divorcing his wife Catherine (the future empress) in order to marry Vorontsova.

== Life ==
She belonged to the celebrated Vorontsov family that reached the pinnacle of power during the last years of the reign of Empress Elizabeth (r. 1741–1762)—Elizaveta's uncle, Mikhail Illarionovich, served as Imperial Chancellor from 1758 to 1765. Her father, General Roman Vorontsov (1717–1783), governed the provinces of Vladimir, Penza, Tambov (1778–1783), and Kostroma, where his name became a byword for graft and inefficiency.

=== Court life ===
Following her mother's death in 1750, the 11-year-old Elizaveta was attached to the Oranienbaum court of Grand Duke Peter's wife, Grand Duchess Catherine Alekseyevna (at this time, Peter was the heir to the Russian Imperial throne). Accounts portray Elizaveta as extremely uncouth: She "swore like a soldier, squinted her eyes, smelled bad, and spit while talking". Baron de Breteuil compared her appearance to that of a "scullery maid of the lowliest kind". Catherine wrote of her as "very ugly, extremely dirty child with an olive skin". Peter, however, developed a fondness for her, which the court was at a loss to explain. Catherine called Elizaveta a "new Madame de Pompadour" (of whom she greatly disapproved), and the Grand Duke took to calling her "my Romanova" (a pun on her patronymic, Romanovna: his own surname was Romanov).

After Elizaveta's lover became emperor in January 1762, he invested her with the Order of Saint Catherine and had rooms prepared for her next to his own in the newly built Winter Palace. She accompanied Peter in all his excursions and adventures, and foreign ambassadors reported to their governments that the emperor intended to banish his wife to a convent in order to marry Vorontsova. Some claim that these rumors drove Catherine to join efforts with Vorontsova's sister, Princess Ekaterina Dashkova, and to stage the palace coup which removed her husband from power in July 1762. Controversy endures to the present day as to whether Catherine took any part in Peter's death 8 days later on 17 July 1762. Maureen Callahan summarized the marital split as follows: "As for her husband, Catherine threw him in jail, and though she couldn't help show some sympathy—allowing him his own bed from home, along with his dogs, violin and even his personal doctor—she refused his most heartfelt and repeated request: She made sure that Peter and his mistress never saw each other again.

=== Later life ===
In her memoirs, Catherine II pulled no punches when discussing her rival Vorontsova. In a letter from June 1762, she claimed that the Vorontsovs had made plans to shut her up in a cloister and put their relative on the throne. Although Vorontsova wished to follow her lover into exile in Holstein (his homeland), his sudden death put an end to this prospect.

The empress arranged her rival's marriage to an army colonel of humble, yet noble background, Alexander Ivanovich Polyansky (1721–1818) and ordered the couple to withdraw to the countryside, where Vorontsova spent the rest of her days in bitterness and ill-health. They had one son, Alexander Alexandrovich Polyansky (1774–1818), who served as a senator in the Russian Empire. Her brothers Alexander (1741–1805) and Semyon (1744–1832) made spectacular careers in the Imperial Russian bureaucracy.

== Portrayed in media ==
- Ruthelma Stevens portrayed Vorontsova in Josef von Sternberg's 1934 film The Scarlet Empress.
- Anastasiya Korolkova portrayed Vorontsova in Ekaterina: The Rise of Catherine the Great a Russian language series from 2014 - 2023.

== Sources ==
- Anisimov, Evgeniĭ Viktorovich. 2004. Five empresses: court life in eighteenth-century Russia. Westport, CT: Greenwood.
- Bolotov, Andrei. 1871. Жизнь и приключения Андрея Болотова, описанные самим им для своих потомков [Life and adventures of Andrei Bolotov, related by he himself for his descendants]. Vol. 2. St. Petersburg.
- Catherine II, Empress of Russia. 1907. Записки императрицы Екатерины II [Memoirs of Empress Catherine II]. St. Petersburg: Izdanie A. S. Suvorina (A. S. Suvorin Publishing).
- Khronos (online encyclopedia of Russian history). No date. Biographical entry for Roman Vorontsov (in Russian).
- Kliuchevskii, Vasilii. 1997. A course in Russian history: the time of Catherine the Great. Armonk, NY: M.E. Sharpe. (Translation of a 19th-century work.)
- Kaus, Gina. 1935. Catherine; the portrait of an empress. Translated from the German by June Head. NY: Viking. Russian trans. online.
- Sakharova, Y.M. 1974. Алексей Петрович Антропов, Aleksei Petrovich Antropov. Moscow: Iskusstvo.
- Sukhareva, O.V. 2005. Воронцова Елизавета Романовна [Vorontsova, Elizaveta Romanovna]. In Кто был кто в России от Петра I до Павла I [Who was who in Russia from Peter I to Paul I]. Moscow.
