= Elizabeth Divov =

Russian courtier (1762–1813)

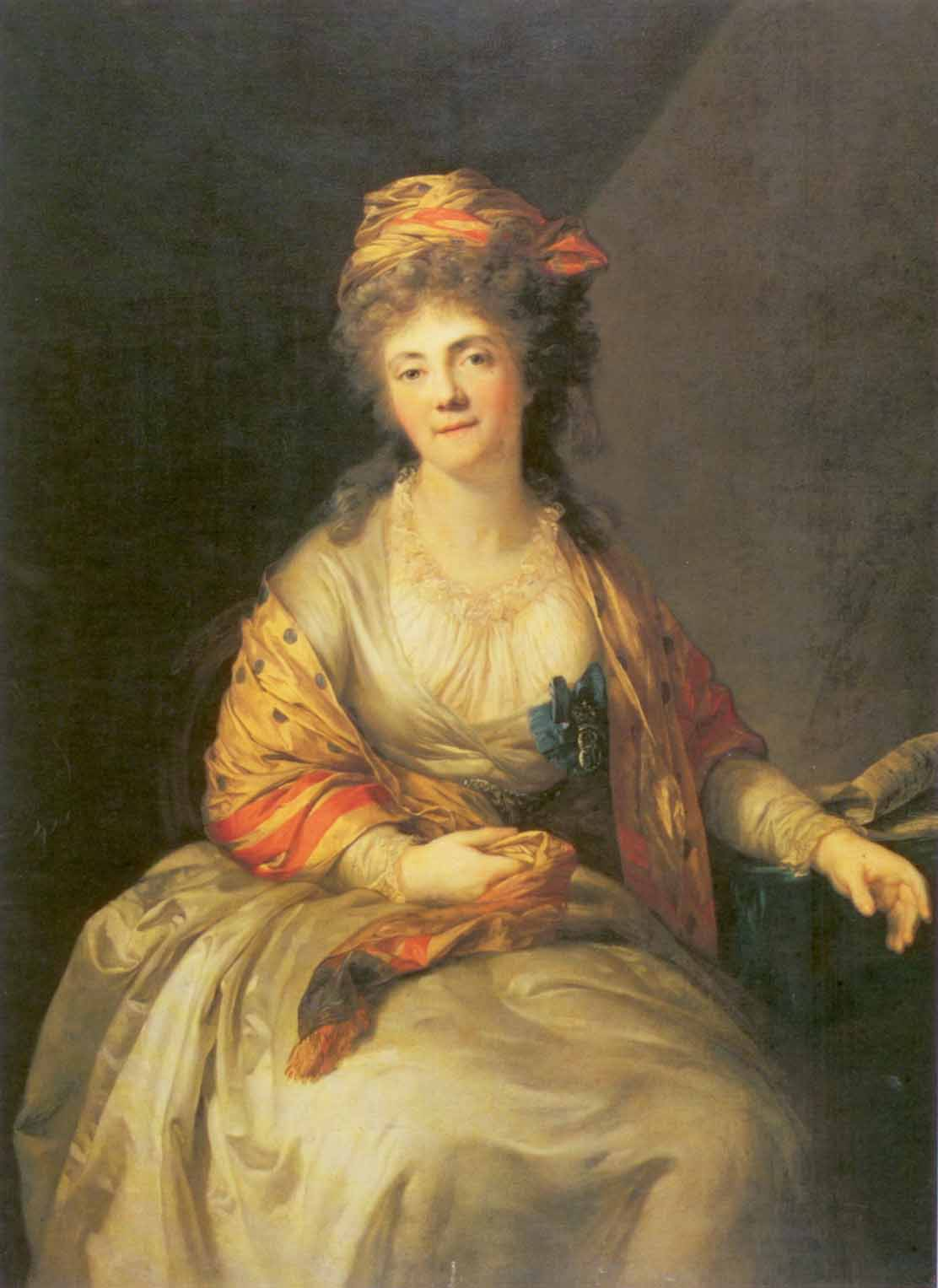
Portrait by Anton Graff, 1794

Elizabeth Divov, also known as Elizaveta Petrovna Divova (Russian: Елизавета Петровна Дивова; née Buturlina; 1762–1813), was a Russian courtier. Her father was Count Pyotr Alexandrovich Boutourlin (Buturlin), and her mother was Maria Romanovna Vorontsova. Princess Dashkova was Elizaveta's maternal aunt.

She served as lady-in-waiting to empress Catherine the Great, and was married in 1784 to Adrian Divov. In 1784 she was suspected to be behind a controversial political satire.

In 1792, Divov visited Sweden with her husband, and became known for her involvement in political plots during her stay. Her house in St. Petersburg, called Little Koblenz, was known as a haven for French émigrés.
