= Vorontsov Palace (Saint Petersburg) =

Palace in St. Petersburg, Russia

Coordinates: 59°55′53″N 30°19′55″E

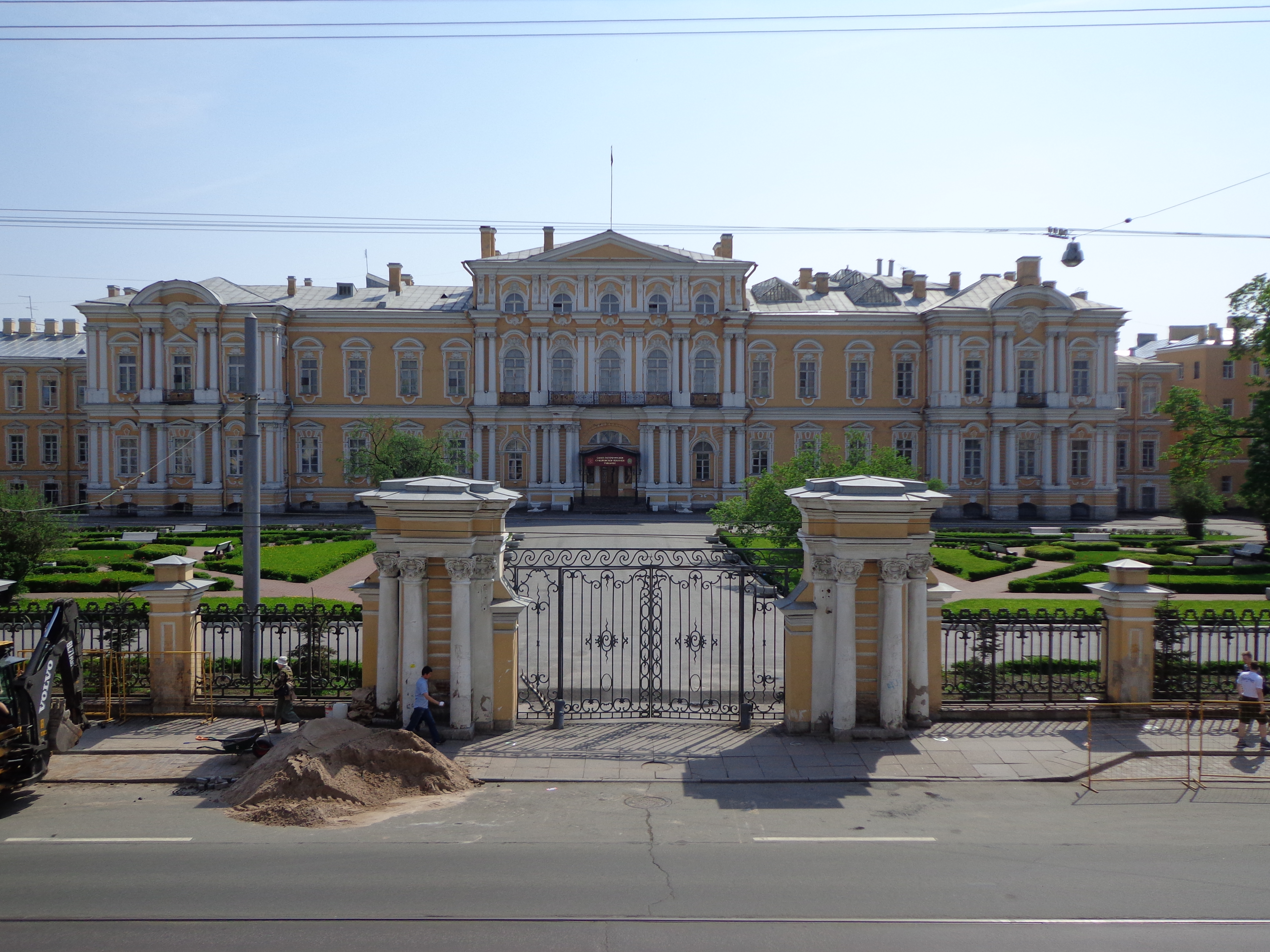
The Vorontsov palace in spring (May 2013)

The Vorontsov Palace (Russian: Воронцо́вский дворе́ц, romanized: Vorontsóvskiy dvoréts) is a Baroque palace compound which occupies a large parcel of land located between Sadovaya Street and the Fontanka River in Saint Petersburg, Russia.

The palace of 50 rooms was built at enormous expense by Francesco Bartolomeo Rastrelli for Count Mikhail Illarionovich Vorontsov, Empress Elizabeth's chancellor and maternal relative by marriage. The palace took eight years to build, starting in 1749. After his niece Elizaveta Vorontsova fell from grace, Vorontsov was effectively exiled from the court and sold his main residence to the crown.

Paul I of Russia gave the palace to the Knights Hospitaller, of which he was Grand Master. Another Italian architect working in Russia, Giacomo Quarenghi, was then asked to modernise the palace. In 1798–1800, Quarenghi added a Catholic chapel to serve exiled French aristocrats who resided in the Russian capital at the turn of the 19th century (see Russian tradition of the Knights Hospitaller for details).

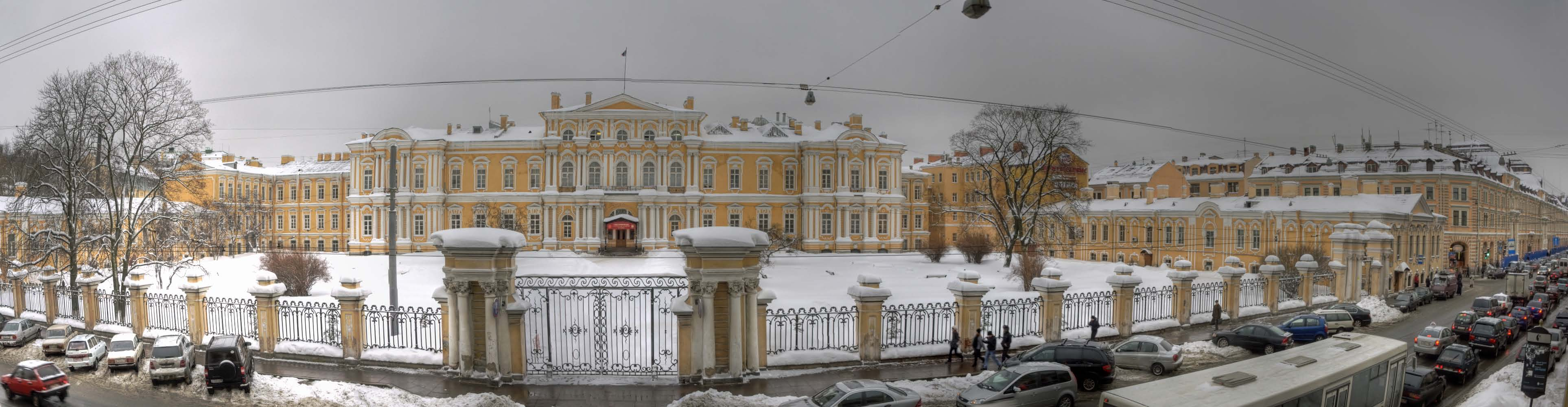
The Vorontsov Palace in winter 2011

Since 1810, the Vorontsov Palace has housed a succession of exclusive military schools, including the famous Page Corps (1810–1918) and the Suvorov Military School (1955–present). The palace is screened from Sadovaya Street by an elaborate cast iron grille, and it is separated from the Fontanka Embankment by a large garden. The Chapel of the Order of Malta went through extensive restoration in 2003 and is currently used for organ recitals.

In 2013, a Monument to graduates of Suvorov schools and cadet corps by sculptor Karen Sarkisov was erected next to the palace.

== See also ==
- List of Baroque residences
- Vorontsov Palace (Alupka)
- Vorontsov Palace (Odessa)
