= Typhus (disambiguation) =

In modern medical English, the term typhus refers to a group of rickettsioses only.

Typhus may also refer to:

== Medical ==
- Typhoid fever or Typhus abdominalis, caused by a subspecies of Salmonella Typhi
- Paratyphoid fever, a disease similar to typhoid fever
- Typhinia, an obsolete synonym for Relapsing fever

== Other uses ==
- Typhus (monster), a monster in Greek mythology
