= Alexander Vorontsov =

Chancellor of the Russian Empire from 1802 to 1805

Alexander Romanovich Vorontsov
- Алекса́ндр Рома́нович Воронцо́в

Chancellor of the Russian Empire
- In office 1802–1804
- Monarch: Alexander I
- Preceded by: Alexander Bezborodko
- Succeeded by: Adam Jerzy Czartoryski (as Foreign Minister)

President of the Board of Trade
- Monarch: Catherine II

Personal details
- Born: 4 February 1741 Saint Petersburg, Russian Empire
- Died: 2 December 1805 (aged 64) Andreyevskoye, Russian Empire
- Parent(s): Roman Vorontsov (father); Marfa Surmina (mother)
- Relatives: Mikhail Illarionovich Vorontsov(uncle); Elizabeth Vorontsova (sister); Yekaterina Dashkova (sister)
- Occupation: Diplomat, politician

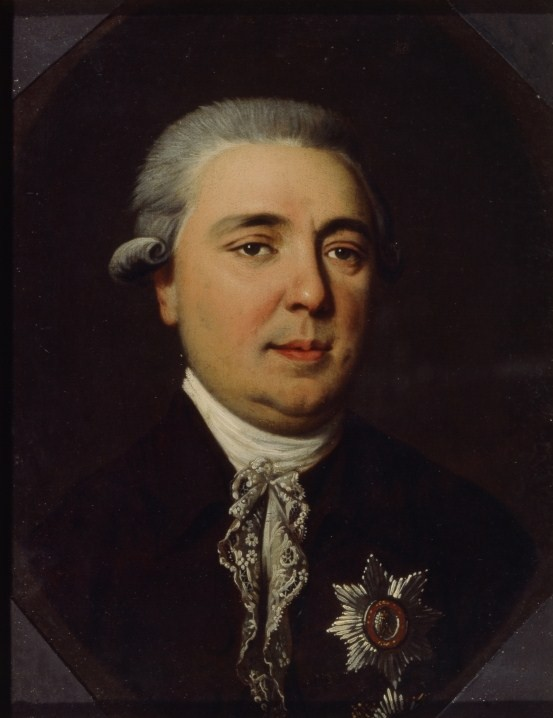
Count Alexander R. Vorontsov.

Count Alexander Romanovich Vorontsov (Russian: Алекса́ндр Рома́нович Воронцо́в) (4 February 1741 – 2 December 1805) was the Chancellor of the Russian Empire during the early years of Alexander I's reign.

He began his career at the age of fifteen in the Izmailovsky regiment of the Guards. He was the son of Russian General-in-chief Roman Illarionovich Vorontsov (1707–1783) and Marfa Ivanovna Surmina (1718–1745). In 1759, Alexander's uncle, the grand chancellor Mikhail Illarionovich Vorontsov, sent him to Strasbourg, Paris and Madrid to train him in diplomacy. Under Peter III, who was in love with his sister Elizabeth, he represented Russia for a short time at the court of St James's. Catherine II created him a senator and president of the Board of Trade; but she never liked him, and ultimately (1791) compelled him to retire from public life.

In 1802, Alexander I summoned him back to office and appointed him imperial chancellor. This was the period of the triumph of the Vorontsovs, who had always insisted on the necessity of a close union with Austria and Great Britain, in opposition to Nikita Panin and his followers, who had leaned on France or Prussia till the outbreak of the French Revolution made friendship with France impossible.

Vorontsov was also an implacable opponent of Napoleon Bonaparte, whose "topsy-turvyness" he was never weary of denouncing. The rupture with Napoleon in 1803 is mainly attributable to him. He also took a leading part in the internal administration and was in favour of a thorough reform of the Governing Senate and the ministries. He retired in 1804. A lifelong bachelor, he possessed an extraordinary memory and a firm and wide grasp of history. His Memoirs of My Own Times is printed in vol. VII of the Vorontsov Archives.

== Family members ==
- Vorontsov – his family
- Mikhail Illarionovich Vorontsov – his uncle
- Ekaterina Romanovna Vorontsova-Dashkova – his sister
- Elizaveta Vorontsova – his sister
- Semyon Romanovich Vorontsov – his brother
- Mikhail Semyonovich Vorontsov – his nephew.

Political offices
Preceded by Aleksandr Borisovich Kurakin (acting)	Imperial Chancellor of Russia; 1802–1804	Succeeded by Adam Jerzy Czartoryski (de facto)
