= Semyon Vorontsov =

Russian diplomat in London

Count Semyon Vorontsov
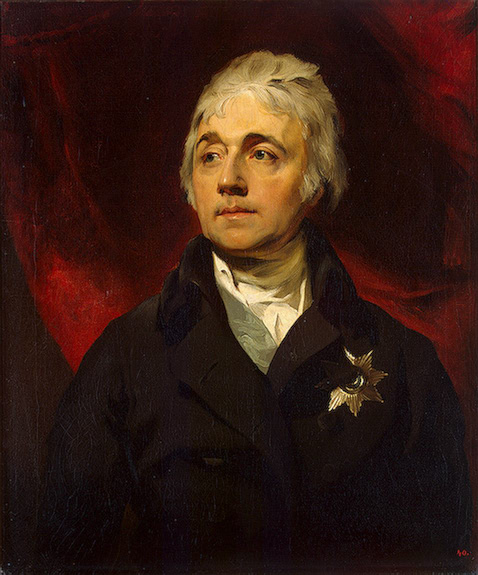
- Portrait by Sir Thomas Lawrence, 1806

Russian Ambassador to the United Kingdom
- In office 25 May 1801 – 15 May 1806
- Preceded by: Yakov Smirnov (as Chargé d'affaires)
- Succeeded by: Pavel Alexandrovich Stroganov (as Chargé d'affaires)

Russian Minister at Vienna
- In office 1783–1785

Personal details
- Born: Semyon Romanovich Vorontsov; 26 June 1744
- Died: 9 July 1832 (aged 88) London, England
- Spouse: Ekaterina Alekseevna Seniavina
- Relations: Alexander Vorontsov (brother); Elizaveta Vorontsova (sister); Yekaterina Vorontsova-Dashkova (sister)
- Children: Mikhail Semyonovich Vorontsov; Catherine Herbert, Countess of Pembroke
- Parent(s): Roman Larionovich Vorontsov; Marfa Ivanovna Surmina

Count Semyon Romanovich Vorontsov (or Woronzow; Russian: Семён Романович Воронцо́в; 26 June [O.S. 15 June] 1744 – 9 July 1832) was a Russian diplomat from the aristocratic Vorontsov family. He resided in Britain for the last 47 years of his life, from 1785 until his death in 1832, during which time he was the Russian ambassador to the Kingdom of Great Britain from 1785 to 1800 and to the United Kingdom from 1801 to 1806.

== Early life ==
Vorontsov's parents were Roman Larionovich Vorontsov (1717–1783) and Marfa Ivanovna Surmina (1718–1745). Among his siblings were Imperial Chancellor Alexander Vorontsov, Elizaveta Vorontsova and Yekaterina Vorontsova-Dashkova, the closest female friend of Catherine the Great.

== Career ==
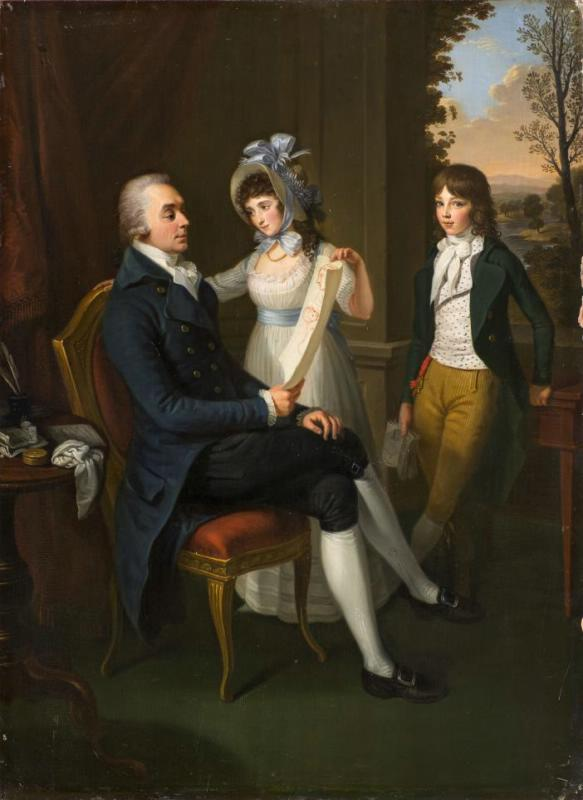
Portrait of Vorontsov with his children, by Ludwig Guttenbrunn, 1790

He distinguished himself during the Sixth Russo-Turkish War (1768–1774) at the battles of Larga and Kagula in 1770. In 1783, he was appointed Russian minister at Vienna, but in 1785 was transferred to London. Vorontsov soon attained great influence and authority in Great Britain.

Quickly acquainting himself with the characteristics of English institutions, with their ways and methods, he was able to render important services to his country. Thus, during the Seventh Russo-Turkish War from 1787 to 1792, he contributed to bringing about the disarmament of the auxiliary British fleet, which had been fitted out to assist the Turks; and in 1793 he obtained a renewal of the commercial treaty between Great Britain and Russia. Over the next three years, he irritated Empress Catherine II with his vehement advocacy for the exiled Bourbons, sharp criticism of the Armed Neutrality League of the North, which he considered disadvantageous to Russia, and his denunciation of the partitions of Poland as contrary to the first principles of equity and a shock to the conscience of Western Europe.

=== Ambassador to the United Kingdom ===
On the accession of Paul I in 1796, Vorontsov was raised to the rank of ambassador extraordinary and minister plenipotentiary and was awarded immense estates in Finland. Neither Vorontsov's detention of the Russian squadron under Makarov in British ports nor his refusal, after the death of Alexander Bezborodko, to accept the dignity of imperial chancellor could alienate the favor of Paul. On 28 December 1796, Vorontsov had a private audience of George III to notify him of the death of Catherine the Great and Paul's accession. It was only when the emperor himself began to draw nearer to France that he began to consider Vorontsov as incompetent to serve Russia in England, and in February 1800 all the count's estates were confiscated. Alexander I on his accession in 1801 at once reinstated him, but ill health and family affairs led him to resign his post in 1806.

=== Later life ===
From his resignation as Ambassador in 1806 until his death in 1832, he continued to live in London. Greville noted in his diary on 3 December 1829, ”Old Woronzow was Ambassador here many years, has lived here ever since, and never learnt a word of English.”

Besides his valuable Note on the Russian War and numerous letters, Vorontsov was the author of an autobiography and Notes on the Internal Government of Russia.

== Personal life ==
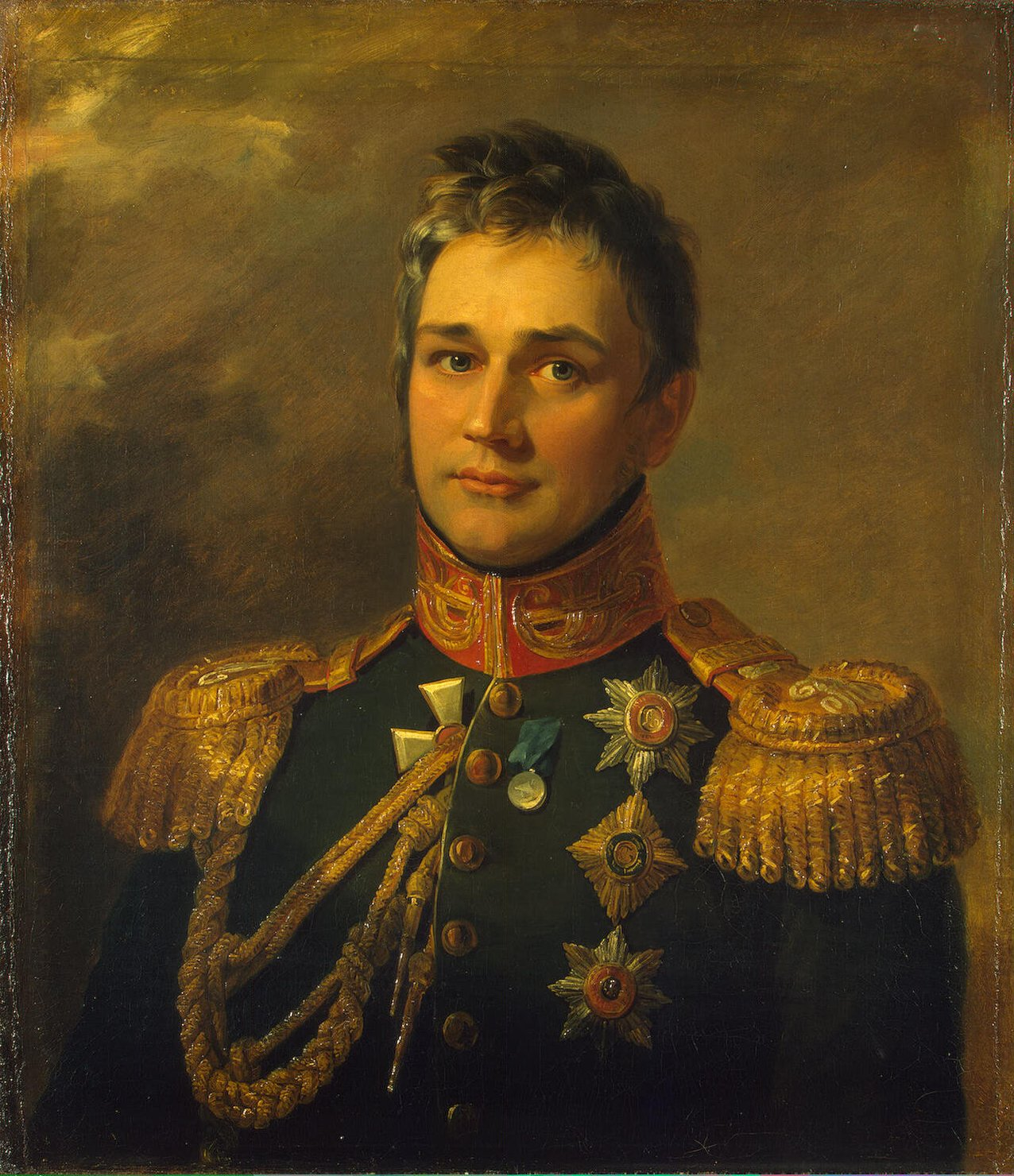
Portrait of his son, Michael, by George Dawe, c. 1820.

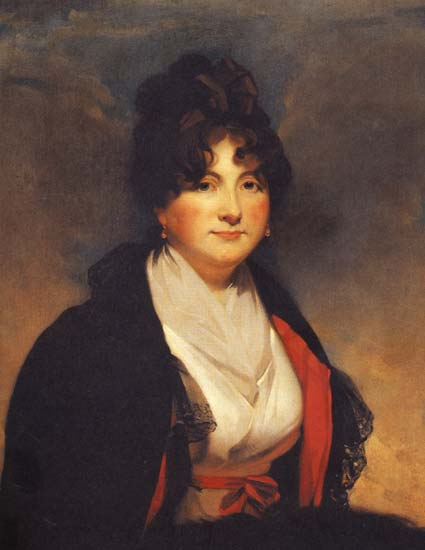
Portrait of his daughter, Catherine, by Sir Henry Raeburn, c. 1810s

Vorontsov married Ekaterina Alekseevna Seniavina (1761–1784), a daughter of Alexei Senyavin and Anna von Bradké. Before her death in 1784, they were the parents of:

- Mikhail "Michael" Vorontsov (1782–1856), who married Polish Countess Elizabeth Branicka.
- Yekaterina "Catherine" Vorontsov (1783–1856), who married George Herbert, 11th Earl of Pembroke, 8th Earl of Montgomery, in 1808.

His wife died on 25 August 1784 in Pisa. Count Vorontsov died on 9 July 1832. He was buried in the Pembroke family vault in Marylebone, London, and a street in St. John's Wood, London, where he resided, is now called Woronzow Road.

=== Legacy and descendants ===
His son, Mikhail, continued his father's Anglophile ways and was an eminent commander in the wars against Napoleon and in the Russian conquest of the Caucasus, for which he was further ennobled as a Russian Prince.

Through his daughter Catherine, he was a grandfather of Lady Elizabeth Herbert (who married Richard Meade, 3rd Earl of Clanwilliam), Sidney Herbert, 1st Baron Herbert of Lea (who married Elizabeth Ashe à Court-Repington), Lady Mary Herbert (who married George Brudenell-Bruce, 2nd Marquess of Ailesbury), Lady Catherine Herbert (who married Alexander Murray, 6th Earl of Dunmore), Lady Georgiana Herbert (who married Henry Petty-Fitzmaurice, 4th Marquess of Lansdowne), and Lady Emma Herbert (who married Thomas Vesey, 3rd Viscount de Vesci).

Diplomatic posts
Preceded by Yakov Smirnov (as Chargé d'affaires)	Russian Ambassador to the United Kingdom; 1801–1806	Succeeded by Pavel Alexandrovich Stroganov (as Chargé d'affaires)
