= Russian Academy =

Russian cultural institute (1783–1841)

The Russian Academy or Imperial Russian Academy (Russian: Академия Российская, Императорская Российская академия) was established in St. Petersburg, Russia, in 1783 by Empress Catherine II of Russia and princess Dashkova as a research center for Russian language and Russian literature, following the example of the Académie Française. In 1841 it was merged into the Imperial Saint Petersburg Academy of Sciences (the predecessor of today's Russian Academy of Sciences).

== Presidents ==
- 1783–1796 – Yekaterina Dashkova (concurrently serving as the Director of the Imperial Academy of Arts and Sciences)
- 1796–1801 – Pavel Bakunin (Бакунин, Павел Петрович) (concurrently serving as the Director, and later President, of the Imperial Academy of Arts and Sciences)
- 1801–1813 – Andrey Andreyevich Nartov (Нартов, Андрей Андреевич)
- 1813–1841 – Aleksandr Shishkov (Шишков, Александр Семёнович)

== See also ==
- V.V. Vinogradov Russian Language Institute of the Russian Academy of Sciences - a modern institution (founded in 1944), playing a similar role.

== Sources ==
- "Российская академия" [Russian Academy]. Brockhaus and Efron Encyclopedic Dictionary (in Russian). Vol. 86. Saint Petersburg. 1890–1907.
- "Академия Российская" [Russian Academy]. Great Soviet Encyclopedia (in Russian) (1st ed.). Moscow: Sovetskaya Entsiklopediya.
- История Академии наук СССР [History of the Academy of Sciences of the USSR] (in Russian). Moscow; Leningrad. 1964.
- Sukhomlinov, M. I. (1875). История Российской Академии, в. 1—8 [History of the Russian Academy, vol. 1–8] (in Russian). Saint Petersburg.
- Fainshtein, M. Sh. (2002). «И славу Франции в России превзойти»: Российская академия (1783—1841) и развитие культуры и гуманитарных наук ["To Surpass the Glory of France in Russia": The Russian Academy (1783–1841) and the Development of Culture and Humanities] (in Russian). Saint Petersburg.
- "Электронное издание Словаря Академии Российской 1789—1794 гг" [Electronic Edition of the Dictionary of the Russian Academy 1789–1794] (in Russian). Archived from the original on 12 December 2008.
- Российская академия (1783—1841): язык и литература в России на рубеже XVIII—XIX веков [The Russian Academy (1783–1841): Language and Literature in Russia at the Turn of the 18th–19th Centuries] (PDF) (in Russian). Saint Petersburg. 2009. ISBN 978-5-86763-246-5.
- Khartanovich, M. F. (2006). "Глава I" (PDF). Гуманитарные научные учреждения Санкт-Петербурга XIX века (исторические очерки) [Humanities Scientific Institutions of Saint Petersburg in the 19th Century (Historical Essays)] (in Russian). Saint Petersburg: Nestor-Istoriya. p. 232. Archived from the original (PDF) on 4 March 2016.
- Vomperskiy, V. P. (1992). "Российская академия (1783—1841)" [The Russian Academy (1783–1841)] (PDF). Russkaya Rech (in Russian) (3): 3–11. Archived from the original (PDF) on 19 February 2015.
