= Vorontsov =

Russian noble family

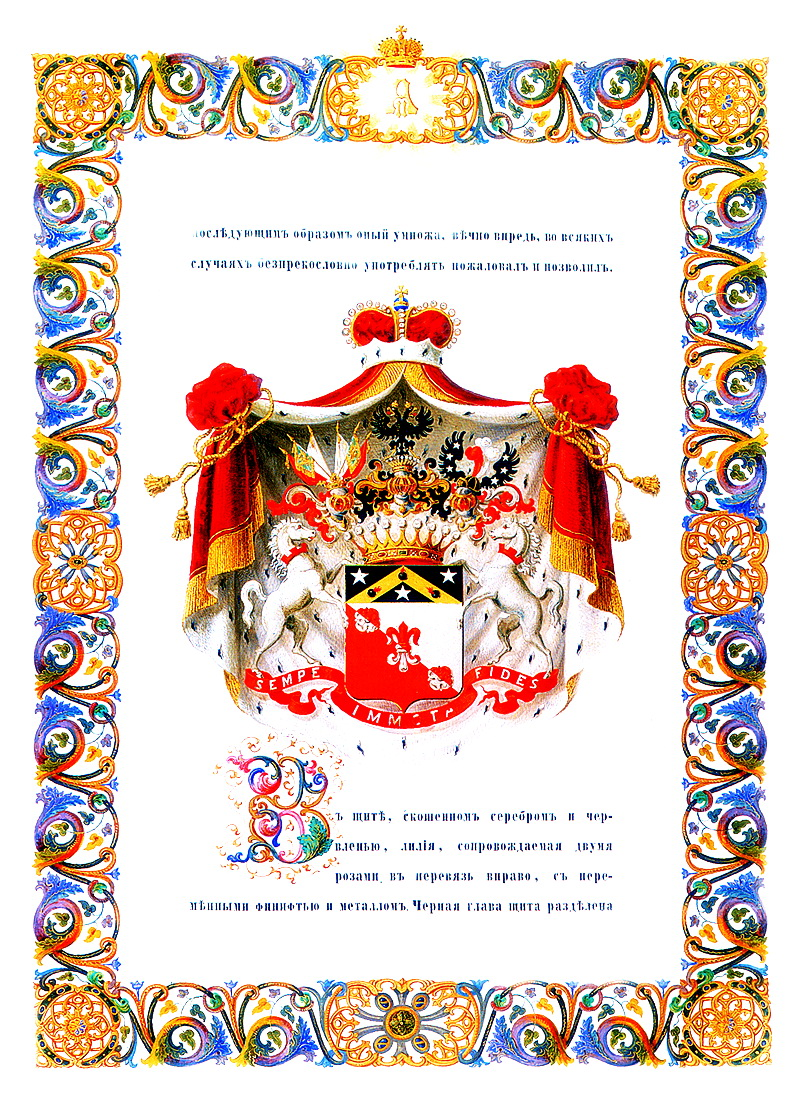
Coat of arms of the Princes Vorontsov in the Empire of Russia (1845)

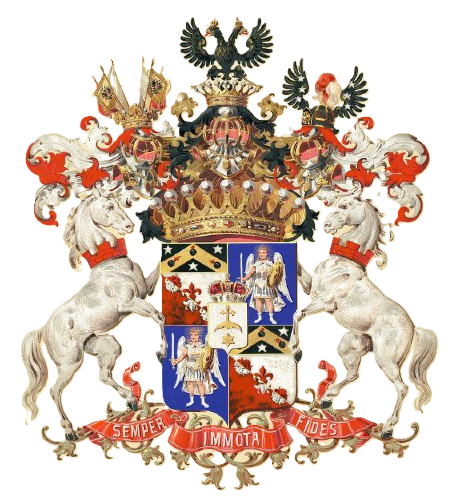
Coat of arms of the Counts Vorontsov-Dashkov (1895)

The House of Vorontsov (Russian: Воронцо́в), also Woroncow and de Woroncow-Wojtkowicz, is the name of a Russian noble family whose members attained the dignity of Counts of the Holy Roman Empire in 1744 and became Princes of the Russian Empire on 6 April 1845, with the style of Serene Highness. Most likely, the Vorontsovs represent a collateral branch of the great Velyaminov family of Muscovite boyars, which claimed male-line descent from a Varangian nobleman named Šimon. The Velyaminovs served as hereditary mayors of Moscow until the office was abolished by Dmitry Donskoy (Prince of Moscow from 1359 to 1389), whose mother Alexandra came from this family.

== History ==
The Vorontsov branch of the Velyaminovs reached a zenith of its power in the person of the boyar Feodor Vorontsov, who became de facto ruler of Russia during the minority of Ivan IV ("Ivan the Terrible", 1543). Three years later, he was accused of treason and beheaded. For the next two centuries, the family history is obscure. Under Empress Elizabeth (reigned 1741–1762), its fortunes soared once again, when Mikhail Illarionovich Vorontsov became Vice-Chancellor of the Russian Empire. The Vorontsov Palace in Saint Petersburg, designed by Rastrelli, remains a monument to his power.

During the reign of Peter III of Russia (January to July, 1762), Mikhail Vorontsov was the most powerful man in Russia, as his niece Elizaveta Vorontsova became the Emperor's mistress. Peter's wife Catherine, alarmed by her husband's plans to divorce her and marry Elizaveta Vorontsova, deposed her husband, with great help from her bosom friend, Yekaterina Romanovna Vorontsova-Dashkova, the wife of Prince Dashkov and Elizaveta's own sister.

Yekaterina Dashkova's brothers, Alexander and Semyon Romanovich, both became notable diplomats. The latter's son, Mikhail Semyonovich Vorontsov (1782–1856), became a prominent general who fostered the colonisation of New Russia and led the Russian army in the Caucasus. The Vorontsovs from this branch were inveterate Anglophiles and supported many English servants, painters, and architects.

Yekaterina Romanovna Vorontsova-Dashkova bequeathed her vast possessions and the Vorontsov-Dashkov surname to her cousin, who formed a junior branch of the Vorontsov family with the distinct Vorontsov-Dashkov surname. Its most notable representative, Count Illarion Ivanovich Vorontsov-Dashkov (1837–1916), served as Minister of Imperial Properties (1881–1897) and as the General Governor of the Caucasus in 1905–1915. He was officially in charge of the victorious Russian forces in the Battle of Sarikamish (December 1914 to January 1915) during the early months of World War I.

== Gallery ==
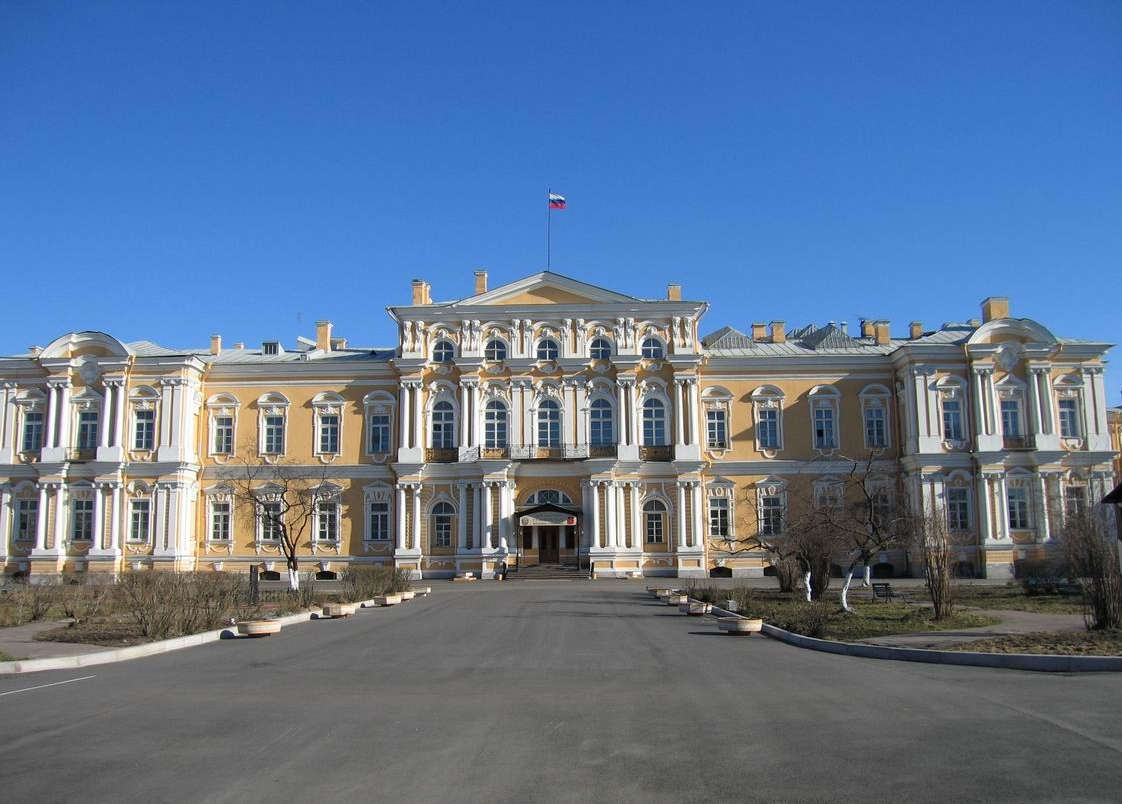
Vorontsov Palace (Saint Petersburg)

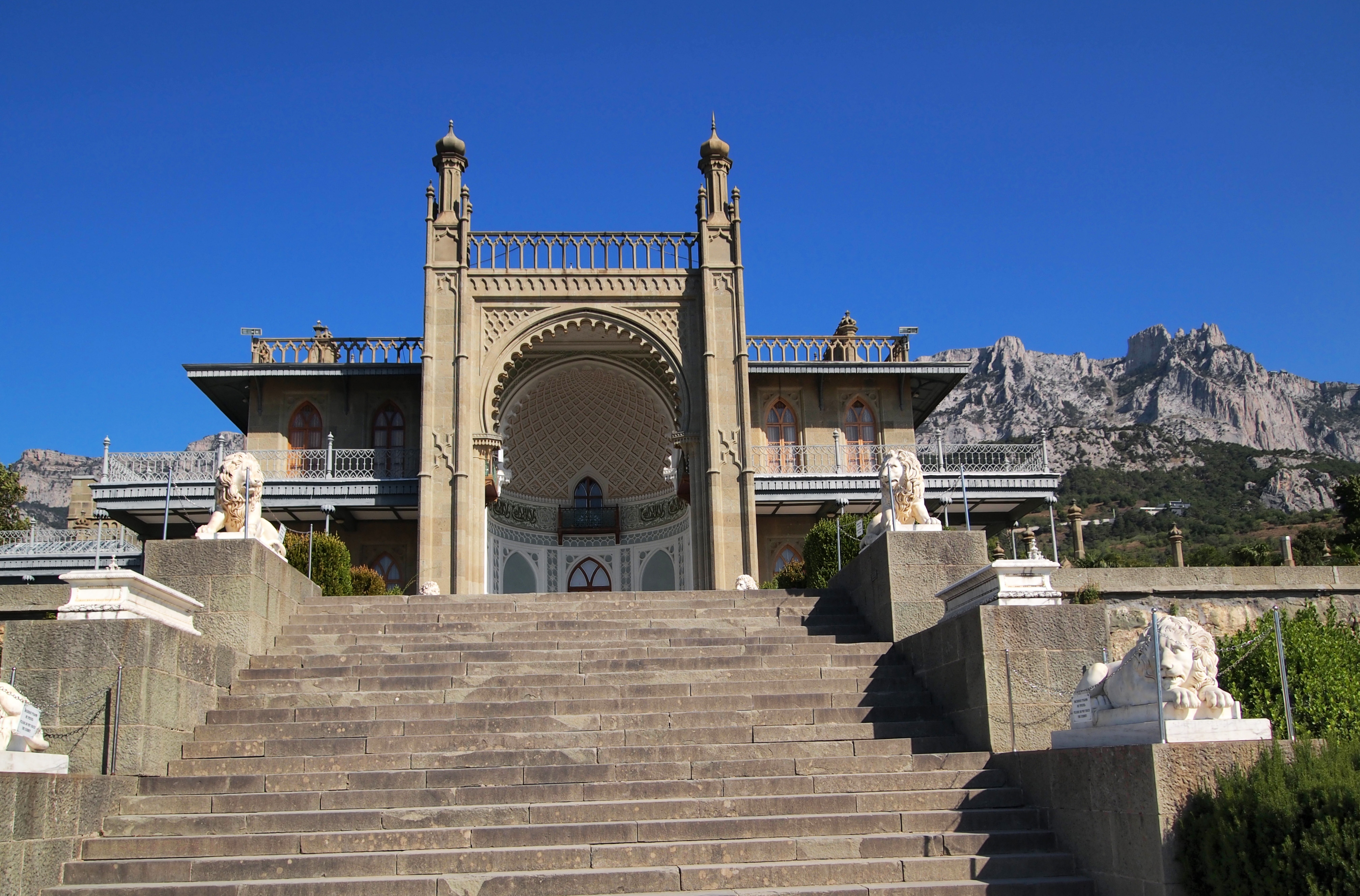
Vorontsov Palace (Alupka)

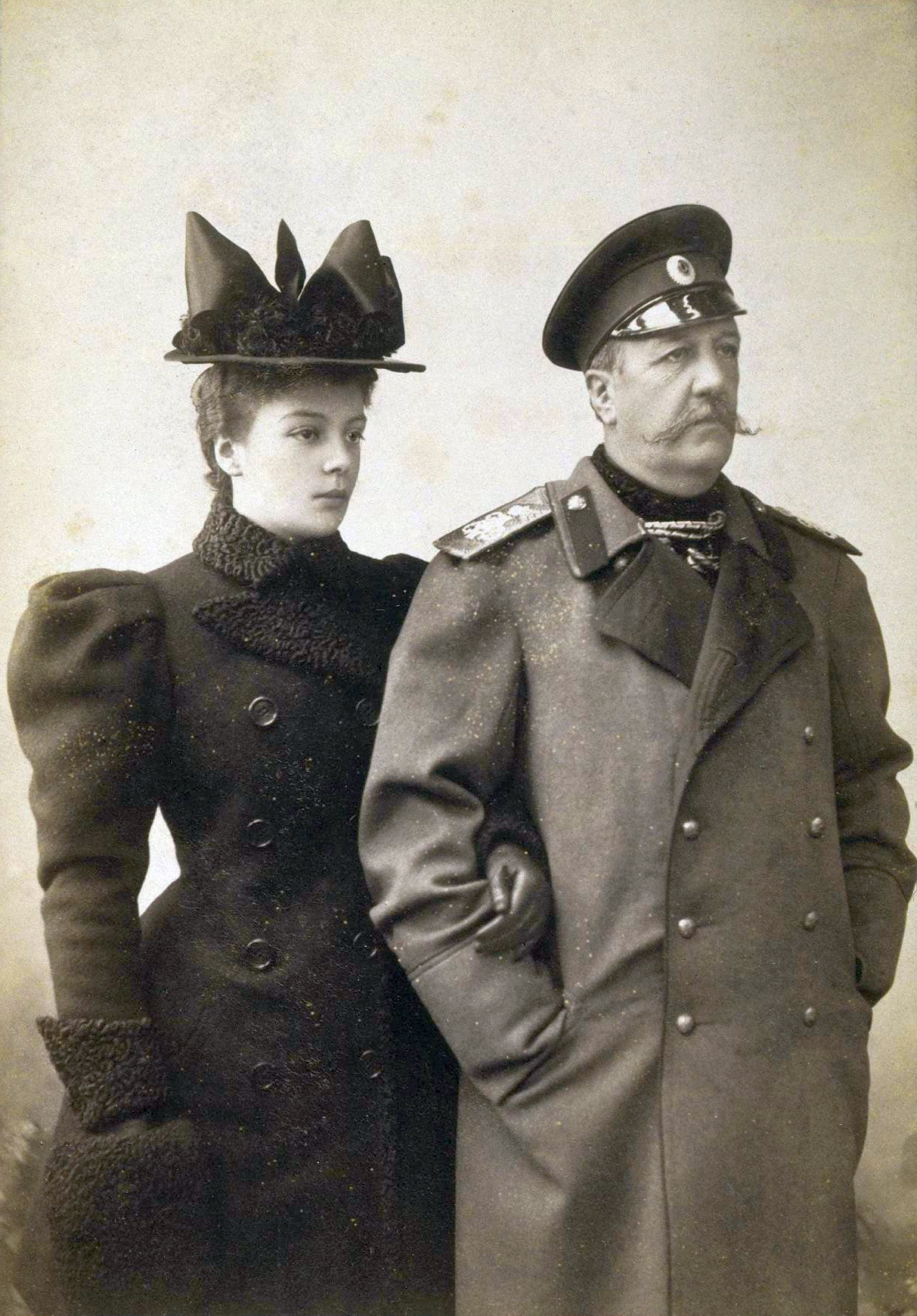
Count Illarion Ivanovich Vorontsov-Dashkov with his daughter, Countess Irina Illarionovna

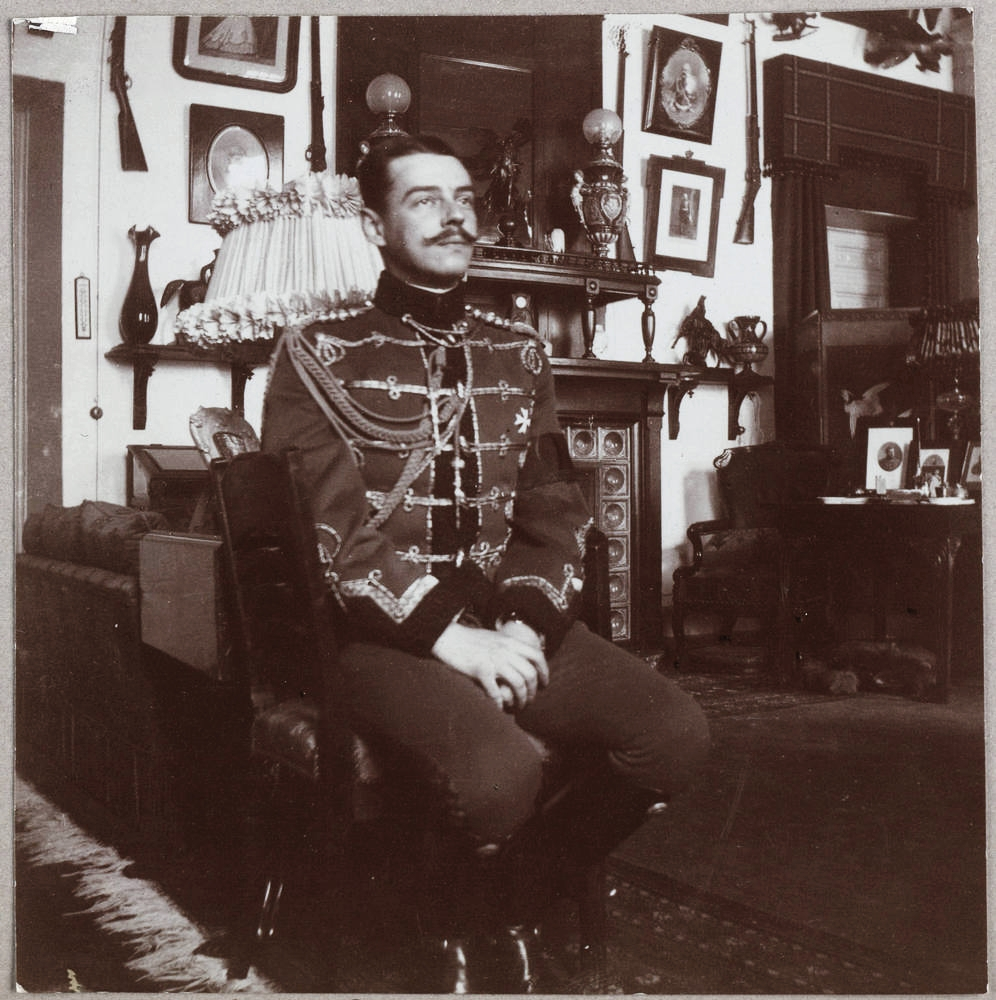
Count Alexander Illarionovich Vorontosv-Dashkov

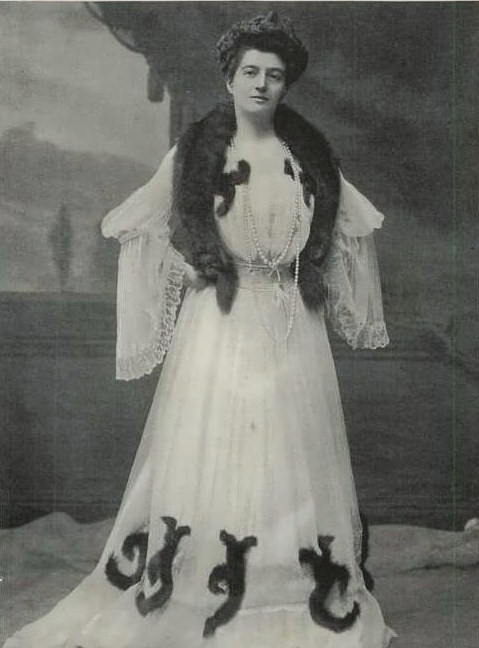
Countess Sofia Illarionovna Demidova (born Vorontsova-Dashkova)

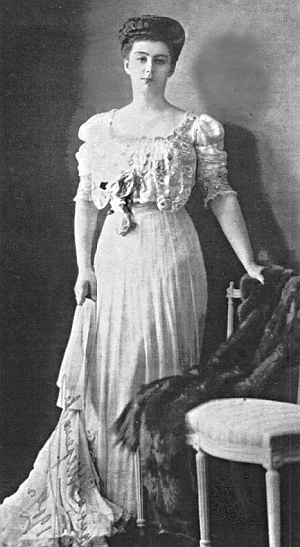
Countess Irina Illarionovna Sheremeteva (born Vorontsova-Dashkova)

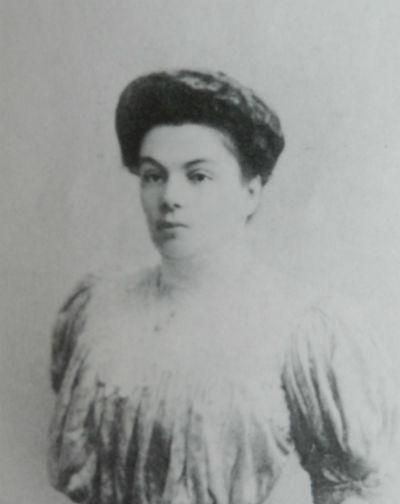
Countess Maria Illarionovna Musin-Pushkina (born Vorontsova-Dashkova)

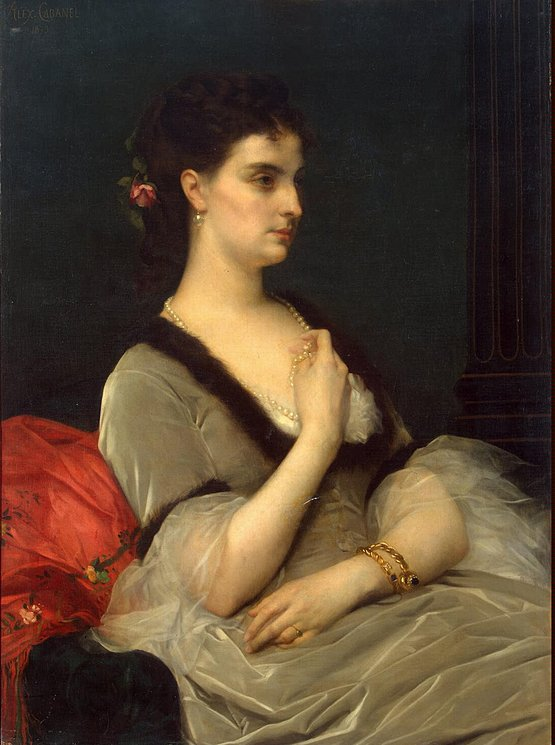
Countess Elizabeth Andreevna Vorontsova-Dashkova (born Shuvalova)

== See also ==
- Vorontsov Palace (Alupka)
- Vorontsov Palace (Odessa)
- Vorontsov Palace (Saint Petersburg)
