= Mikhail Illarionovich Vorontsov =

Russian statesman and diplomat

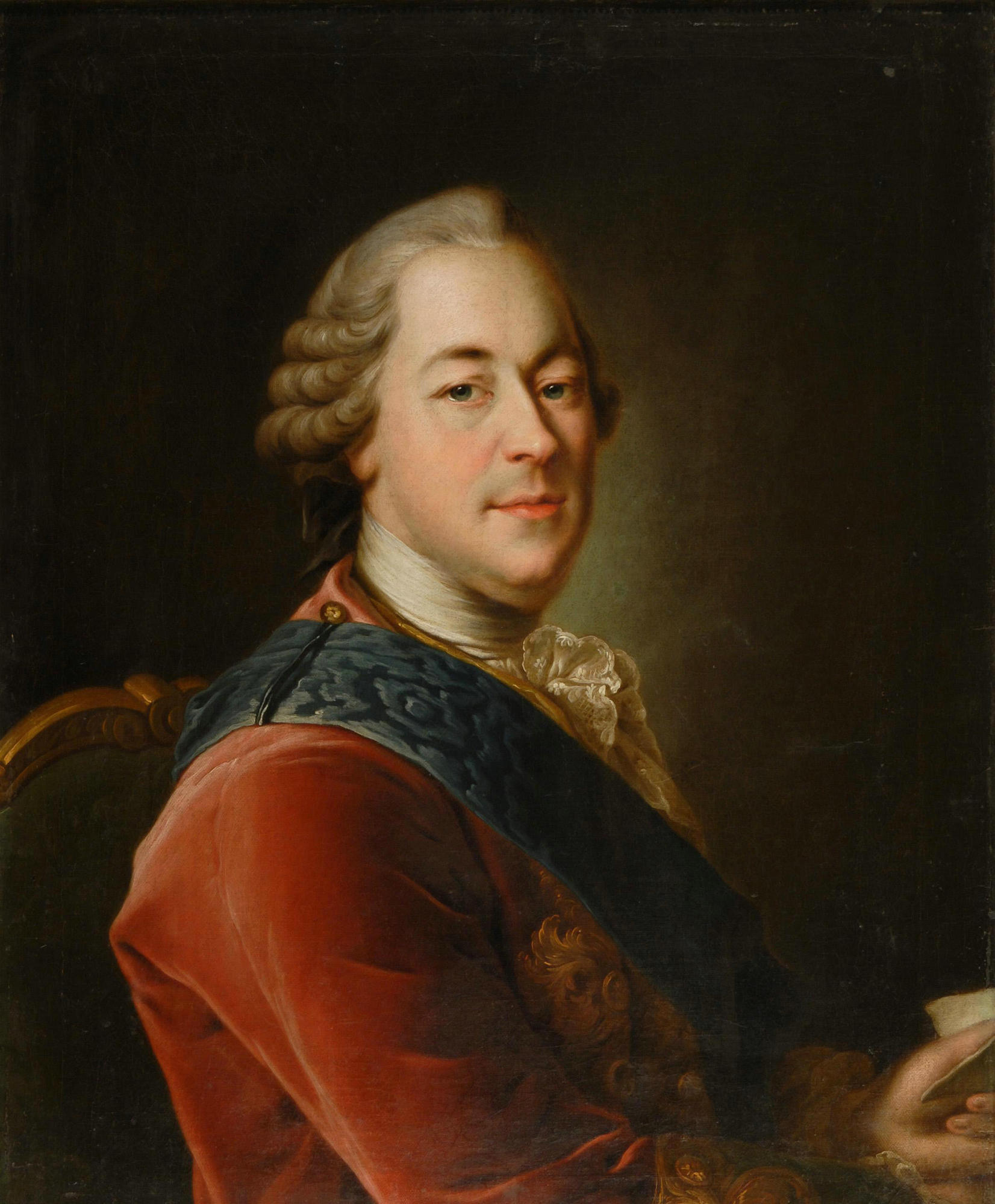
Count Mikhail I.Vorontsov

Count Mikhail Illarionovich Vorontsov (Russian: Михаил Илларионович Воронцов) (12 July 1714 – 15 February 1767) was a Russian statesman and diplomat, who laid foundations for the fortunes of the Vorontsov family.

At the age of fourteen, Vorontsov was appointed a kammerjunker at the court of the tsesarevna Yelizaveta Petrovna, whom he materially assisted during the famous coup d'etat of 6 December 1741, when she mounted the Russian throne on the shoulders of the Preobrazhensky Grenadiers. On 3 January 1742 Vorontsov married countess Anna Karlovna Skavronskaya, the empress's maternal first cousin, and in 1744 was created a count and vice-chancellor. His envy of Aleksei Petrovich Bestuzhev-Ryumin induced him to participate in Count Lestocq's conspiracy against that statesman. The empress's affection for him (she owed much to his skilful pen and still more to the liberality of his rich kinsfolk) saved him from the fate of his accomplices, but he lived in a state of semi-eclipse during Bestuzhev's ascendancy.

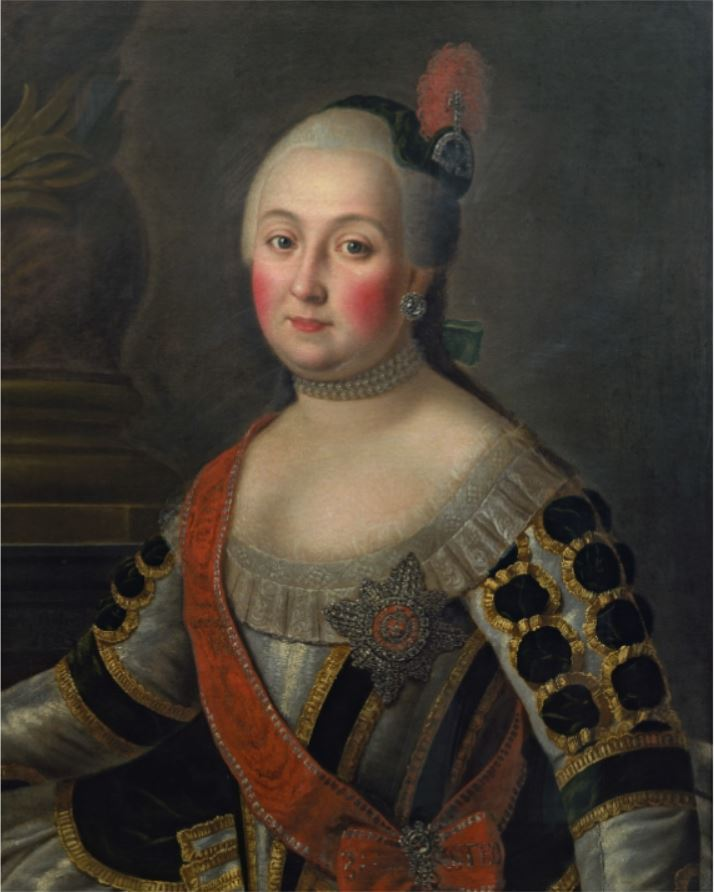
Anna Vorontsova

When Bestuzhev fell from grace, Vorontsov was made imperial chancellor in his stead. Though well-meaning and perfectly honest, Vorontsov as a politician was singularly timorous and irresolute, always taking his cue from the court. For example, under Elizabeth he was an avowed enemy of Prussia and a warm friend of Austria and France, but he made no effort to prevent Peter III from reversing the policy of his predecessor. Yet he did not lack personal courage and endured torture after the coup of 9 July 1762, rather than betray his late master. Having advanced his niece Yelizaveta to the position of favourite mistress of Peter III, he naturally greatly disliked Peter's wife, Catherine, and at first refused to serve under her, though she reinstated him in the dignity of chancellor. When he found that real control over foreign affairs was in the hands of Nikita Panin, he resigned his office in 1763.

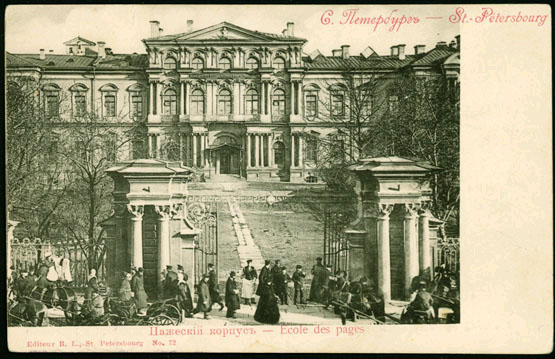
Vorontsov Palace on Sadovaya Street in St Petersburg.

Mikhail Vorontsov may be said to have revived the fortunes of his ancient and illustrious family. His name is preserved in the lavish St Petersburg palace that he commissioned from the imperial architect Bartolomeo Rastrelli. He squandered most of his personal fortune on that edifice but was subsequently obliged to sell it to the crown for lack of the funds required to complete its interior decoration. His niece Catherine was on intimate terms with her royal namesake, Catherine II, and his nephew Alexander Romanovich Vorontsov also attained the dignity of imperial chancellor in the early years of Alexander I's reign.
