= Yekaterina Vorontsova-Dashkova =

Russian noblewoman (1743–1810)

Yekaterina Vorontsova Dashkova
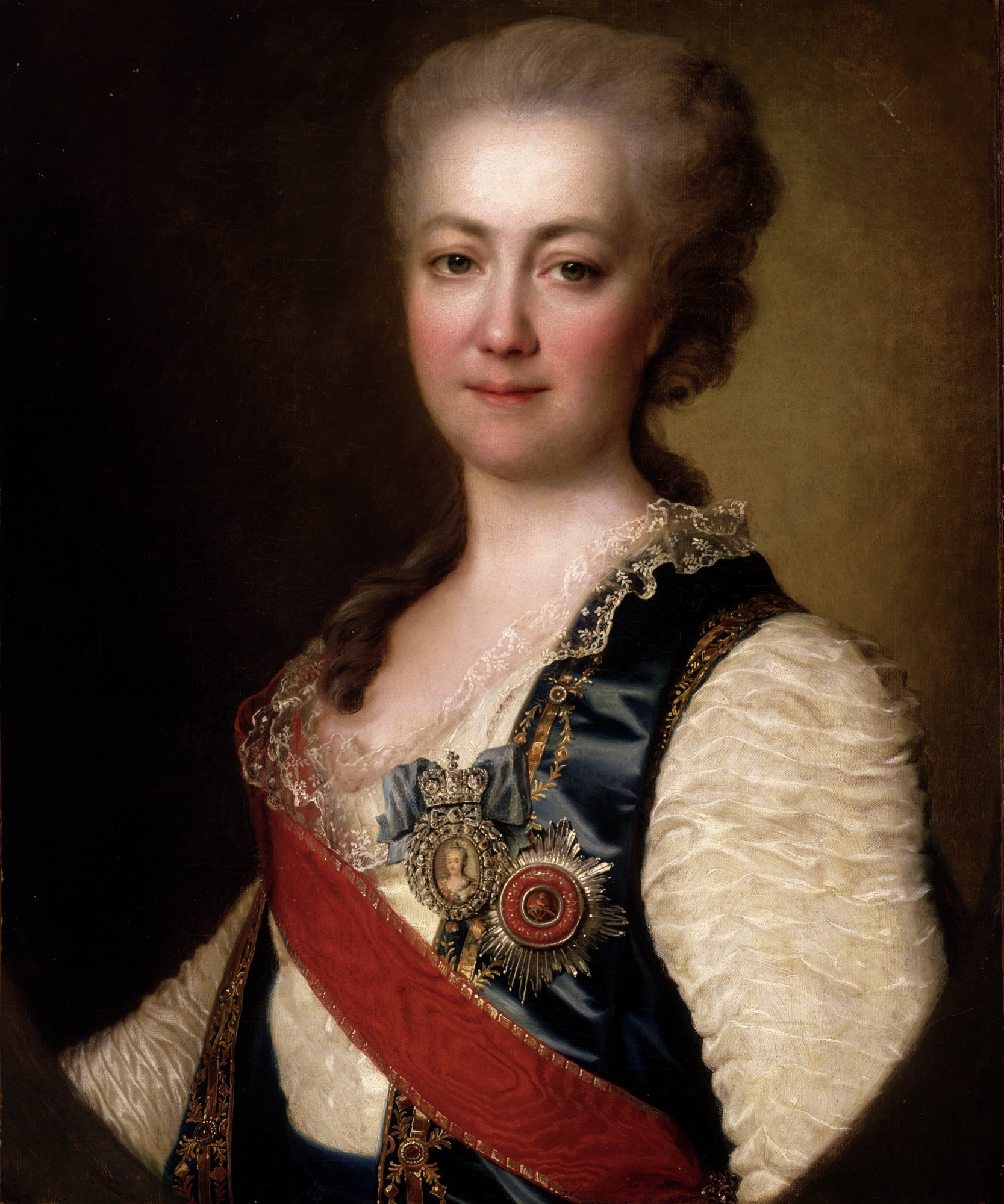
- Portrait by Dmitry Levitsky, 1784
- Born: Yekaterina Romanovna Vorontsova; 28 March 1743; Saint Petersburg, Russia
- Died: 15 January 1810 (aged 66); Moscow, Russia
- Spouse: Prince Mikhail Ivanovich Dashkov
- Children: Anastasia Dashkova; Mikhail Dashkov; Pavel Dashkov
- Parents: Roman Vorontsov (father); Marfa Vorontsova (mother)

Director of Saint Petersburg Academy of Sciences
- In office 1783–1796
- Monarchs: Catherine II; Paul I
- Preceded by: Sergey Domashnev
- Succeeded by: Pavel Bakunin

Chairwoman of Imperial Russian Academy
- In office 1783–1796
- Monarchs: Catherine II; Paul I
- Preceded by: office created
- Succeeded by: Pavel Bakunin

Princess Yekaterina Romanovna Dashkova (Note: In this name that follows East Slavic naming customs, the patronymic is Romanovna and the family name is Dashkova.) (born Countess Vorontsova; Russian: Екатери́на Рома́новна Да́шкова [Воронцо́ва]; (Note: Russian pronunciation: [jɪkətʲɪˈrʲinə rɐˈmanəvnə vərɐnˈtsovə ˈdaʂkəvə]) 28 March 1743 – 15 January 1810) (Note: Though her memoirs list her birth date as 1744, they are footnoted as a "slip of the pen".) was a Russian noblewoman. She was a major figure of the Russian Enlightenment and a close friend of Empress Catherine the Great. She was part of the coup d'état that placed Catherine on the throne.

Vorontsova-Dashkova was the first woman in the world to head a national academy of sciences, the first woman in Europe to hold a government office, and the president of the Russian Academy, which she helped found. She also published prolifically, with original and translated works on many subjects, and was invited by Benjamin Franklin to become the first female member of the American Philosophical Society.

== Early life and education ==
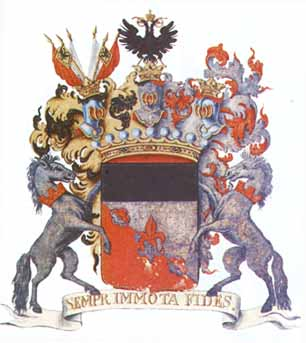
Coat of arms of the Vorontsov family.

Born into an old House of Vorontsov, Countess Yekaterina Romanovna was the daughter of Count Roman Vorontsov (1717–1783), a member of the Senate, and his wife, Marfa Ivanovna Surmina (1718–1745), divorced Princess Dolgorukova. Her uncle Mikhail Illarionovich and older brother Alexander both served as Imperial Chancellor. Her younger brother Semyon was a Russian ambassador to Great Britain, and a celebrated Anglophile. She had two older sisters: Maria, later Countess Buturlina, who married Count Peter Buturlin, and Elizabeth, who married state advisor Alexander Polyansky. Among her godparents were Empress Elizabeth I and Grand Duke Peter Petrovich, later Emperor Peter III; her mother was a lady-in-waiting and very close friend of the Empress.

When Yekaterina was just 2 years old, Marfa died and Count Roman was an absent father, so the children were sent to different places. Alexander continued to live with their father, but Semyon was raised in the countryside by their grandfather and the three sisters went to live with their uncle Mikhail at the lavish Vorontsov Palace., who provided his nieces with an exceptionally good education and spared no expenses with them.

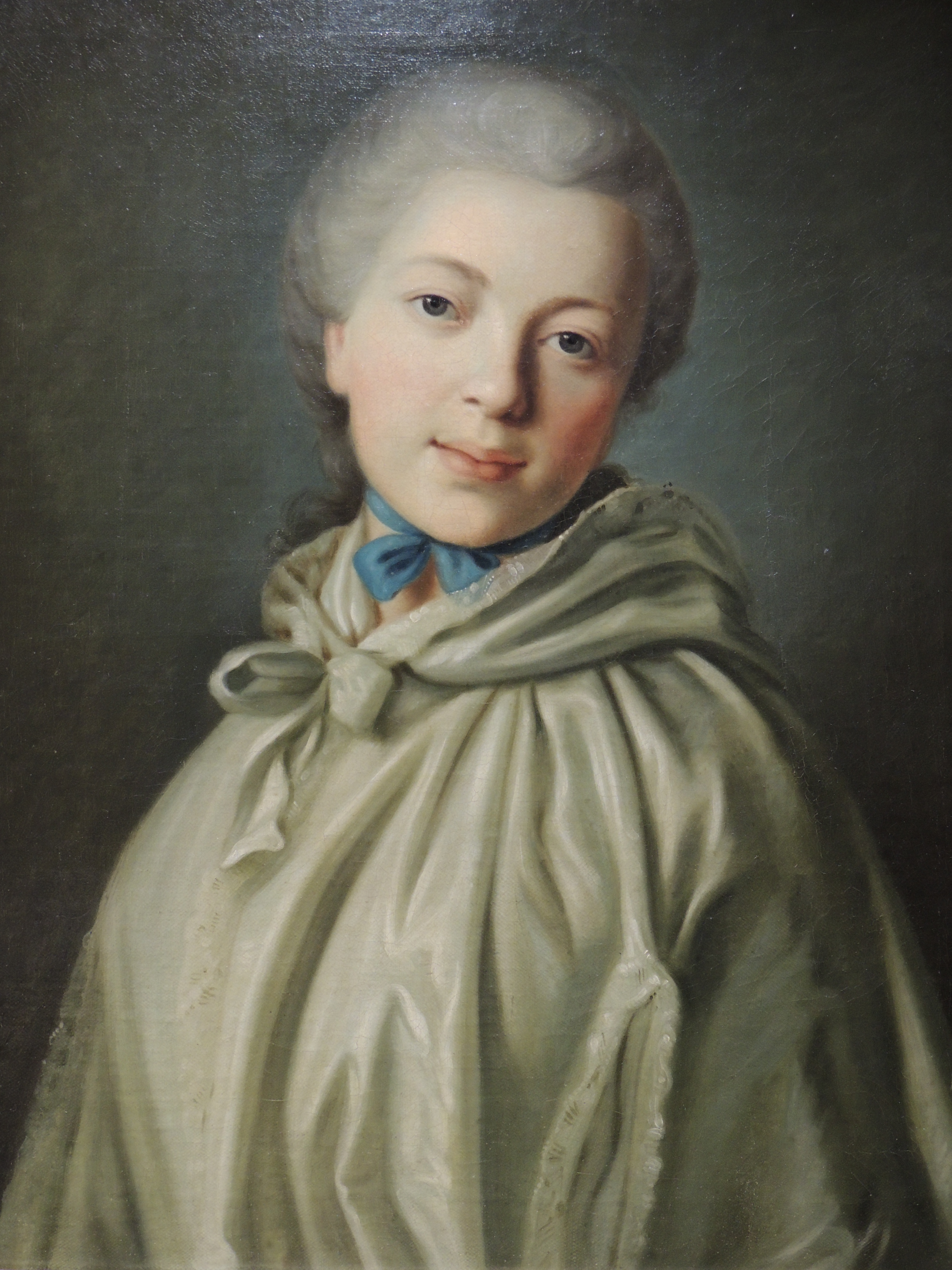
Painting by Pietro Antonio Rotari.

Yekaterina learned several languages (Russian, French, Italian and German), studied mathematics at the University of Moscow and read French literature – according to her memoirs, her favourites were Bayle, Montesquieu, Boileau and Voltaire. She also developed an interest in politics at a very young age and was allowed by her uncle to go through his papers, reading diplomatic letters from Russian ambassadors to illustrious foreigners like the Emperor of China (the content of which she describes in her memoirs), which gave her an inside look at how diplomacy worked. She grew up a well-educated, well-read, bright and intelligent girl.

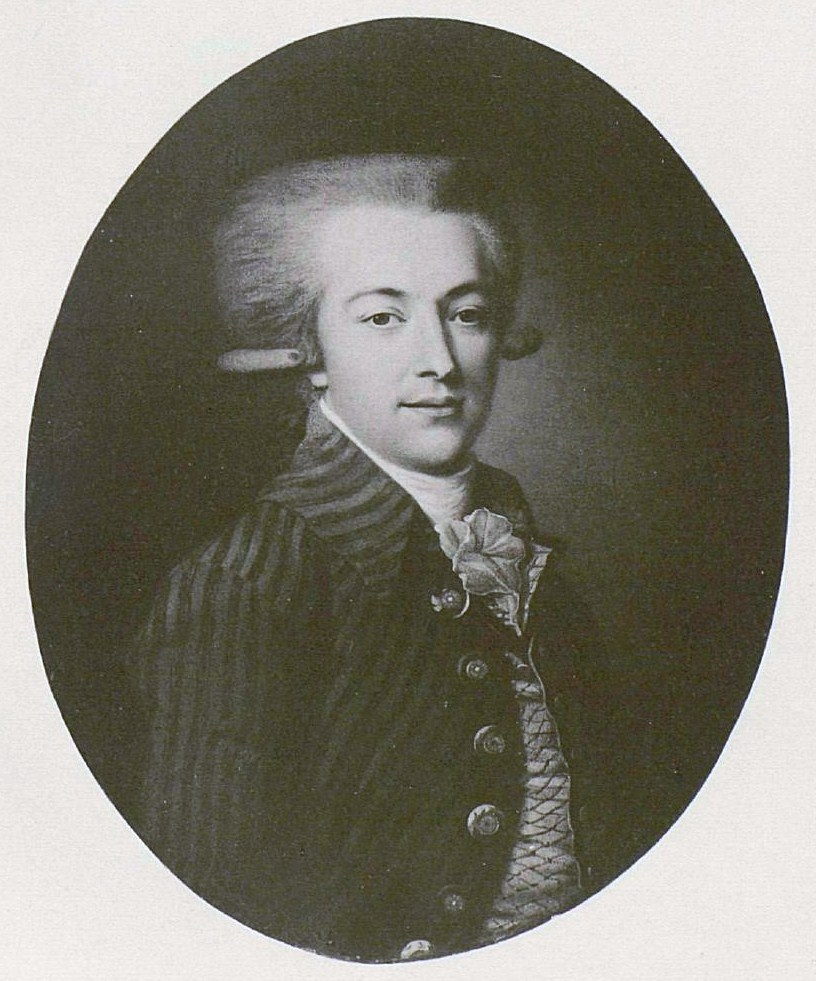
Her husband, Prince Mikhail Dashkov.

== Life at court and marriage ==
Just like her older sisters, Yekaterina went to live at the Russian court when she became a teenager and, by favour of her godmother Empress Elizabeth I, appointed as one of her maids-of-honour. There, she became acquainted with the Grand Duchess Catherine, 14 years older than her, and the pair bonded over their love of literature, particularly French Enlightenment authors, like Voltaire. She supported the Grand Duchess through her difficult marriage to Grand Duke Peter Petrovich. To Yekaterina's embarrassment, her sister Elizabeth became Peter's mistress.

At 15, she met 22-year-old Second Lieutenant Prince Mikhail Dashkov of the Imperial Guards and the two fell in love. The couple went to live in Moscow and married a year later, in February 1759. She became known as Princess Vorontsova-Dashkova or simply Princess Dashkova. The couple had three children: Anastasia (born in February 1760), Mikhail (born in January 1761) and Pavel (born in May 1763). Her son Mikhail died in the autumn of 1762.

== Catherine's coup d'état ==
The couple was close friends with Grand Duchess Catherine, and disliked the Grand Duke Peter, fearing for the future of Russia under the rule of the pro-Prussia future tsar. In December 1761, Empress Elizabeth became severely ill and died January 5, 1762. Her nephew ascended the throne, began undoing her policies and kept a submissive position towards his idol and Russia's enemy, Frederick the Great, much to the displeasure of his court and military. Yekaterina, along with several nobleman and members of the Imperial Guards, led a coup d'état against him on June 28, 1762, that put his wife on the throne.

She continued to be loyal to the newly crowned Empress Catherine. However, their friendship gave place to a more estranged relationship as Yekaterina often disliked the men the Empress took as lovers, and often resented the grace and devotion shown to them. She was also disappointed when her request to become a colonel of the Imperial Guard was denied. There were also some tensions over what Catherine the Great called in her letters an exaggerated account of her friend taking the lead part in the coup d'état. She may have also done this to belittle Yekaterina's resolve and ambition, which made her a potential rival in her eyes, capable of taking her away from the throne as she had been of putting her there.

== Foreign travels ==
When Prince Dashkov died in 1764, Yekaterina decided to ask to leave court and was granted permission, starting in 1768 a 14-year-long journey through Europe, where she was welcomed in several courts with respect and admiration.

=== Paris ===
In Paris, she became good friends with Diderot and Voltaire, who admired and respected her. She also met Benjamin Franklin in the French capital on February 3, 1781 and the two became close friends, corresponding frequently and showing mutual respect and admiration.

=== United Kingdom and Ireland ===
Yekaterina also corresponded with Garrick, Dr. Blair, and Principal William Robertson, meeting them during her visit to the United Kingdom and entrusting the education of her son Pavel to the latter. She was also friends with English painter Georgiana Hare-Naylor, daughter of Jonathan Shipley, whom she met in London.

She lived in Edinburgh from December 1776 to June 1779 at Palace of Holyrood, where she was involved and wounded in a sword duel with another lady, and donated a collection of Russian commemorative medals to the University of Edinburgh on the occasion of her son Pavel's graduation from that school.

Having recovered from her duel wound, she traveled to Ireland to visit her friend Lady Catherine Hamilton, daughter of John Ryder, the Archbishop of Tuam. She can be seen in a painting by Francis Wheatley watching from a balcony a review of the Dublin Volunteers on November 4, 1779, during her Irish visit.

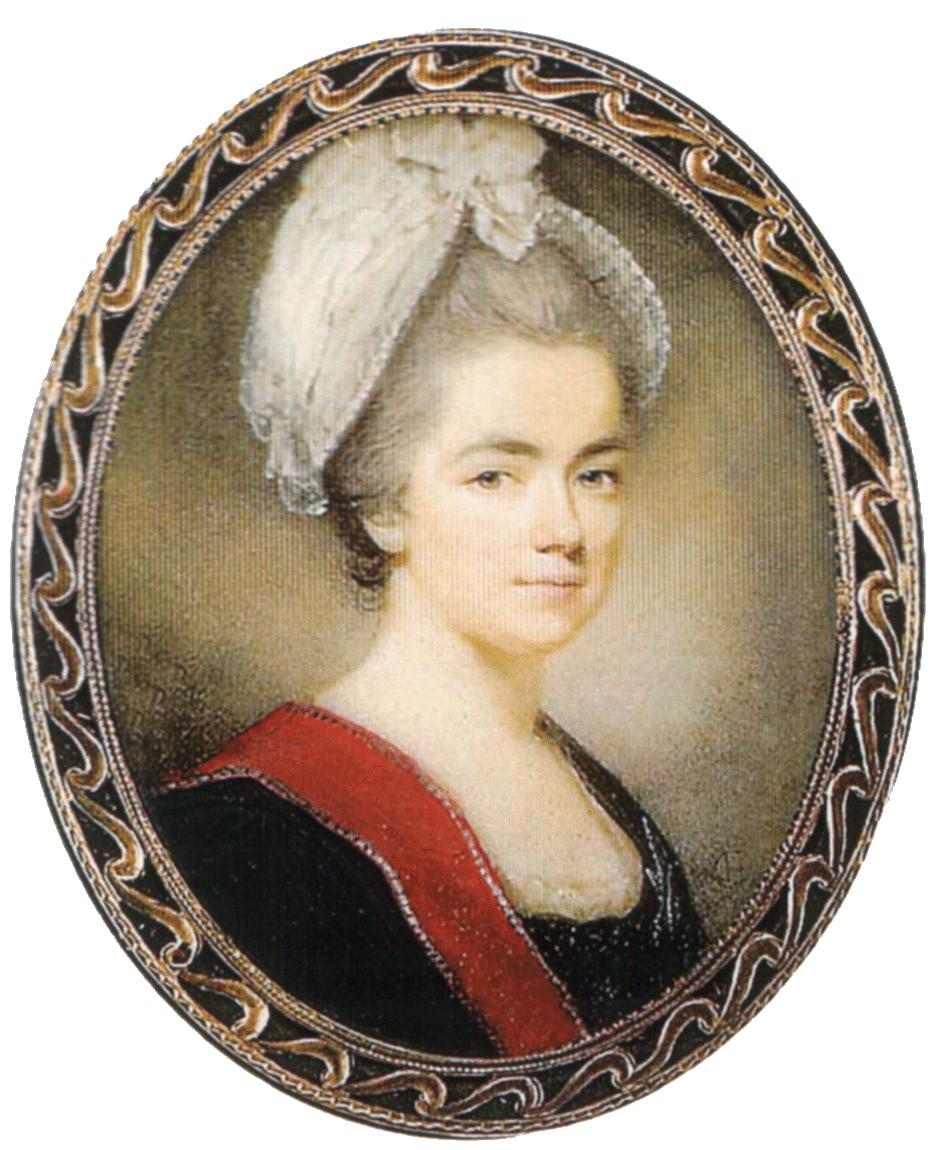
Yekaterina Romanovna in the 1770s by Ozias Humphry

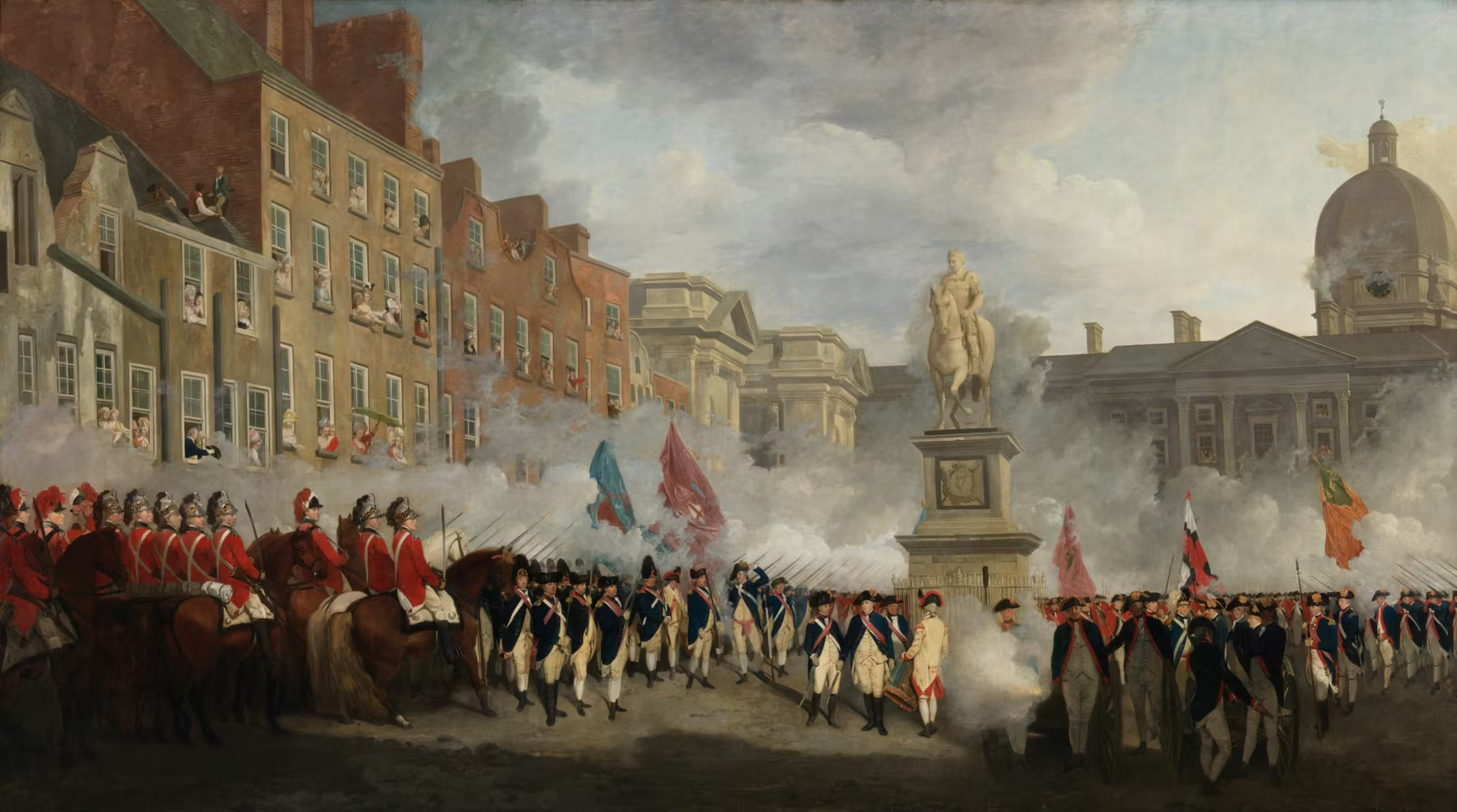
''The Dublin Volunteers on College Green by Francis Wheatley.

== Career ==
At the end of 1782, Yekaterina returned to Russia and was welcomed by the Empress. Her son Pavel had become an adjutant of Grigory Potyomkin and married a lower-class woman, Anna Alferova, in January 1788, later leaving her for his mistress. Her daughter Anastasia was forced into an arranged marriage, ending in debt and involved in many scandals.

In January 1783, the princess was appointed director of the Imperial Academy of Arts and Sciences (known now as the Russian Academy of Sciences) by Catherine the Great. She became the first woman in the world to head a national academy of sciences. Famous in her own right as a philologist, she guided the ailing Academy to prominence and intellectual respectability. In October 1783, Yekaterina was also named the first president of the newly created Russian Academy and launched a project for the creation of a 6-volume dictionary of the Russian Languages in 1789. In 1783, she was the first foreign woman elected an honorary member of the Royal Swedish Academy of Sciences and was invited by her friend Benjamin Franklin to become the first woman to join the American Philosophical Society in 1789.

== Exile and death ==
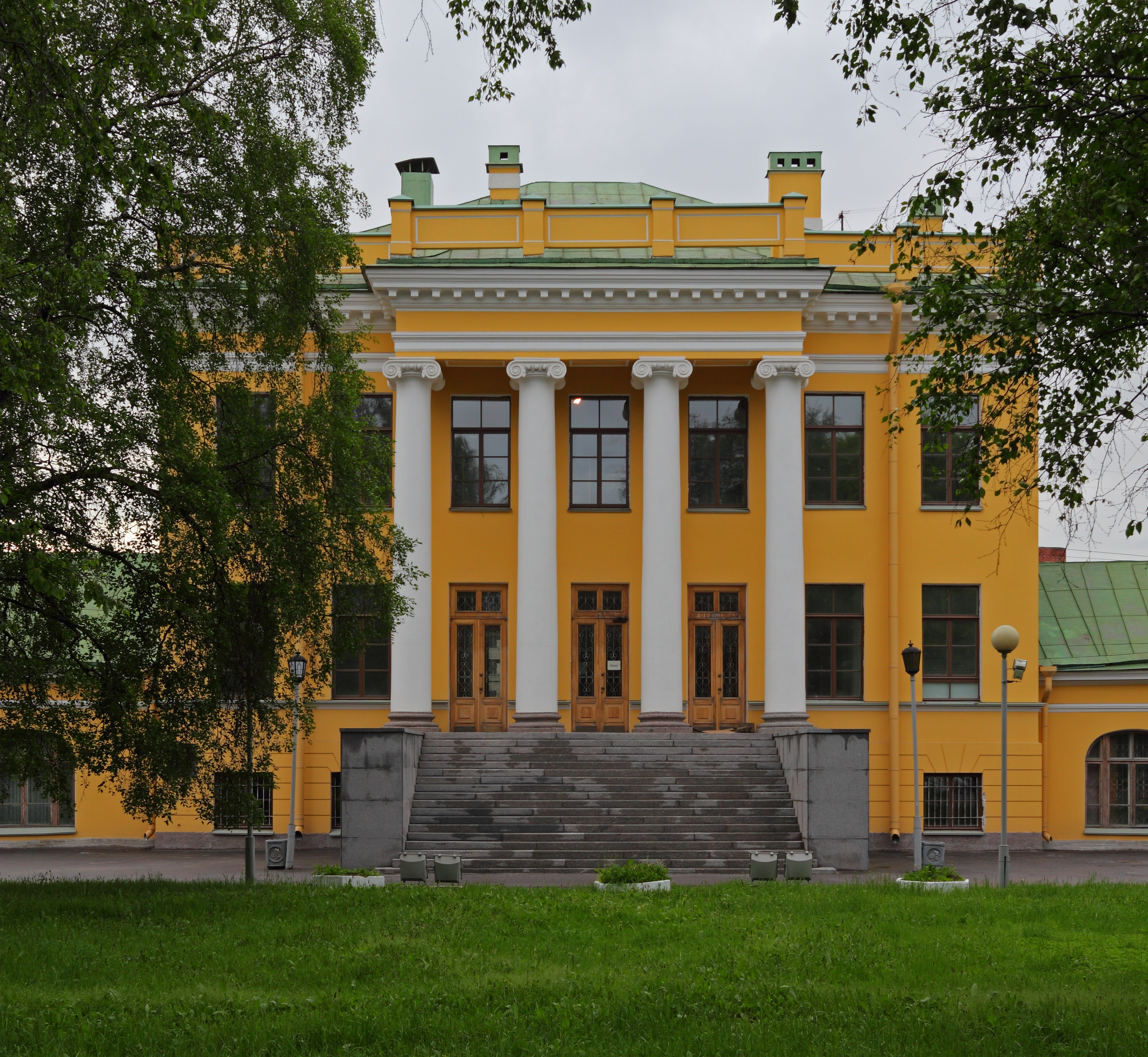
Dashkova's villa in Kiryanovo, near St. Petersburg.

When the Empress died in 1796 and her son Emperor Paul I succeeded her, Yekaterina was sent into exile by the new tsar "to meditate on the events of 1762". Eventually, the exile was ended after a petition of her friends and she was allowed to spend the last years of her life on her rural estate in Troitskoye, west of Moscow.

In 1803, Catherine Hamilton sent her cousin Martha Wilmot to visit the princess in Russia; in 1805, Wilmot was joined by her sister Catherine and the two sisters ended up living with Yekaterina as her companions, editing and translating her memoirs to English (they were originally written in French). Martha was like a daughter to the princess, who even called the Anglo-Irish woman Mavra Romanovna as if she had actually adopted her, leaving her a fortune and some material possessions upon her death. Catherine left Russia in 1807 and Martha in October 1808.

Her son Pavel died in January 1807 and bequeathed his fortune to his cousin Ivan Vorontsov.

Yekaterina Romanovna Vorontsova-Dashkova died in Moscow on 4 January 1810, at 66 years of age.

== Works and legacy ==
Besides her work on the 6-volume dictionary of the Russian Languages, Yekaterina edited a monthly magazine, and wrote at least two novels: The Marriage of Fabian and a comedy entitled Toissiokoff. The University of Edinburgh opened in 2010 the Princess Dashkova Russian Centre in her honor.

Her memoirs were published in French in 1804 (Mon Histoire), then edited and translated to English by Martha Wilmot in 1840 in two volumes (Memoirs of the Princess Daschkaw, written by herself) and the Russian version of her memoirs was translated by Alexander Herzen in 1857.

=== Exhibitions ===
The Princess and the Patriot: Ekaterina Dashkova, Benjamin Franklin and the Age of Enlightenment exhibition was held in Philadelphia, USA from February to December 2006. They met only once, in Paris in 1781. Franklin was 75 and Dashkova was 37. Franklin and Dashkova were both evidently impressed with each other. Franklin invited Dashkova to become the first woman to join the American Philosophical Society in 1789. Later, Dashkova reciprocated by making him the first American member of the Russian Academy. The correspondence between Franklin and Dashkova was the highlight of the exhibition.

=== Compositions ===
Yekaterina Romanovna Vorontsova-Dashkova was also an accomplished composer. She loved to compose her own music and collect and transcribe the folk music of Russia. As a child, she was given art and music lessons but was not able to become a professional musician until later on in life because it was considered to be appropriate for a noble lady. Amateur music concerts were a component in the earlier years of Catherine the Great's reign. At these concerts, Yekaterina would often perform her songs even though her husband and Catherine the Great would make fun of them. Dashkova composed a variety of pieces in a variety of languages throughout her lifetime. For example, she composed arias, songs, spiritual hymns, and folk songs in Russian, English, French and Italian.

Short list of compositions:

- A Collection of Airs
- Andante
- Air Russe
- Sweet Enslaver
- How Imperfect is Expression
- Nel dirti addio bel idol mio

== See also ==
- Maria Choglokova
- Praskovya Bruce

== Sources ==
- The princess & the patriot: Ekaterina Dashkova, Benjamin Franklin, and the Age of Enlightenment, Volume 96, Part 1, Editor Sue Ann Prince, American Philosophical Society, 2006, ISBN 978-0-87169-961-9
- Woronzoff-Dashkoff, A. Dashkova: A Life of Influence and Exile. American Philosophical Society: Philadelphia, 2008.
- The memoirs of Princess Dashkova, Editors Jehanne M. Gheith, Alexander Woronzoff-Dashkoff, Translator Kyril FitzLyon, Duke University Press, 1995, ISBN 978-0-8223-1621-3
- "Princess Ekaterina Romanovna Vorontsova Dashkova", Great Women Travel Writers: From 1750 to the Present, Editors Alba Amoia, Bettina Knapp, Continuum International Publishing Group, 2006, ISBN 978-0-8264-1840-1
