= List of Légion d'honneur recipients by name (L) =

The French government gives out the Legion of Honour awards, to both French and foreign nationals, based on a recipient's exemplary services rendered to France, or to the causes supported by France. This award is divided into five distinct categories (in ascending order), i.e. three ranks: Knight, Officer, Commander, and two titles: Grand Officer and Grand Cross. Knight is the most common and is awarded for either at least 20 years of public service or acts of military or civil bravery. The rest of the categories have a quota for the number of years of service in the category below before they can be awarded. The Officer rank requires a minimum of eight years as a Knight, and the Commander, the highest civilian category for a non-French citizen, requires a minimum of five years as an Officer. The Grand Officer and the Grand Cross are awarded only to French citizens, and each requires three years' service in their respective immediately lower rank. The awards are traditionally published and promoted on 14 July.

The following is a non-exhaustive list of recipients of the Legion of Honour awards, since the first ceremony in May 1803. 2,550 individuals can be awarded the insignia every year. The total number of awards is close to 1 million (estimated at 900,000 in 2021, including over 3,000 Grand Cross recipients), with some 92,000 recipients alive today. Only until 2008 was gender parity achieved amongst the yearly list of recipients, with the total number of women recipients since the award's establishment being only 59 at the end of the second French empire and only 26,000 in 2021.

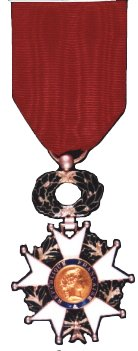

| Recipient | Dates (birth – death) | General work & reason for the recognition | Award category (date) |
|---|---|---|---|
| Marcel L'Herbier | | | |
| Eve Curie Labouisse | | Daughter of Marie Curie | Officier |
| René Lacoste | | | |
| Lars Levi Laestadius | | First Scandinavian to receive the Honor for his participation in the La Recherche Expedition of 1838–40. | |
| John LaFarge | | | |
| Joseph-Clovis-Kemner Laflamme | | | |
| Léo Richer Laflèche | | | |
| Guillaume Joseph Nicolas de Lafon-Blaniac | 1773–1833 | French general of the Revolutionary and Napoleonic wars | Grand Officier (1833) |
| Antonio Lago | | Italian entrepreneur who founded Talbot-Lago | |
| Frank Purdy Lahm | | | |
| Johan Laidoner | | | |
| Charles Laking | | | |
| Charles Lallemand | | | |
| Yannick Lallemand | 1937– | Military chaplain, Légion Étrangère | Grand Officier (2024) |
| Imants Lancmanis | | Latvian painter and art historian. | |
| Gustave Lanctot | | | |
| Bernard Landry | | | |
| Clifton John Langeard | | | |
| Claude Lanzmann | | | |
| Edgard de Larminat | | | |
| Jean-Marc de La Sablière | | | |
| Ralph Lauren | | | |
| Charles Laurent | | | |
| T. E. Lawrence | | | |
| Harold Lawton | | | |
| Henrik Lax | 1946– | Finnish politician | |
| Eusebio Leal | 1942–2020 | Cuban historian | Commander (2013) |
| Jeff Leatham | 1971– | American floral designer | Knight |
| Maurice Leblanc | 1864–1941 | French novelist | |
| Félix Leclerc | | | |
| Philippe Leclerc de Hauteclocque | | | |
| Suzanne Leclézio | 1898–1987 | French resistance fighter, nurse, railway social worker | Knight |
| Ang Lee | 1954– | Taiwanese filmmaker | |
| Paul Legentilhomme | | | |
| James Gordon Legge | | | |
| Jacques Léglise | | French golf champion, President of the French Golf Federation | |
| Jean-Marie Lehn | | | |
| Frederic Leighton, 1st Baron Leighton | | | |
| John A. Lejeune | | | |
| Thomas Lemar | | World Cup winning footballer | |
| Curtis LeMay | | | |
| Lyman Lemnitzer | | | |
| Janez Lenarčič | | Slovene diplomat | |
| Charles-Amable Lenoir | 1860–1926 | French painter | Knight |
| Aimé Lepercq | | | |
| Eugène Lepoittevin | | | |
| Henry Lerolle | 1848–1929 | French painter | Knight (1902) |
| Jean-François Le Sueur | | French Composer | |
| Victor Levasseur | | | |
| René Lévesque | | | |
| Claude Lévi-Strauss | | | |
| Émile Lévy | 1826–1890 | French painter | |
| Edward Mann Lewis | | American World War I General | |
| Henry Balding Lewis | | American World War II General | |
| Jerry Lewis | | | |
| William Leymergie | | | |
| Sonja Licht | | Serbian sociologist and political activist | |
| Hunter Liggett | | | |
| Odd Lindbäck-Larsen | | Norwegian World War II military officer and concentration camp survivor. | |
| Charles Lindbergh | | | |
| Paavo Lipponen | | | |
| Hugo Lloris | | World Cup winning footballer | |
| Jack Lockett | | | |
| John Bruce Lockhart | | Scotland, Great War | |
| Sébastien Loeb | | World Rally Championship driver and 9-times World Champion. | |
| William Edmond Logan | | | |
| Leonard Lomell | | | |
| Jean-Daniel Lorieux | b. 1937 | Fashion and war photographer | Knight (2003) |
| Pierre Lorillard IV | | | |
| Jim Lovell | | | |
| Simon Fraser, 15th Lord Lovat | | | |
| Cecil Lowther | | | |
| Maurice Low | | WW II veteran RCAF, navigator in a Royal Air Force pathfinder squadron | |
| Gerald Loxley | | Major RAF | |
| Jean Jacques Étienne Lucas | | Captain of Redoubtable at the Battle of Trafalgar. | |
| David Lynch | | | |

== See also ==
- Legion of Honour
- List of Legion of Honour recipients by name
- List of foreign recipients of Legion of Honour by name
- List of foreign recipients of the Legion of Honour by country
- List of British recipients of the Legion of Honour for the Crimean War
- Legion of Honour Museum
- Ribbons of the French military and civil awards
- War Cross (France)
