= Põltsamaa Castle =

Castle in Estonia

- Põltsamaa linnus
- Põltsamaa, Estonia
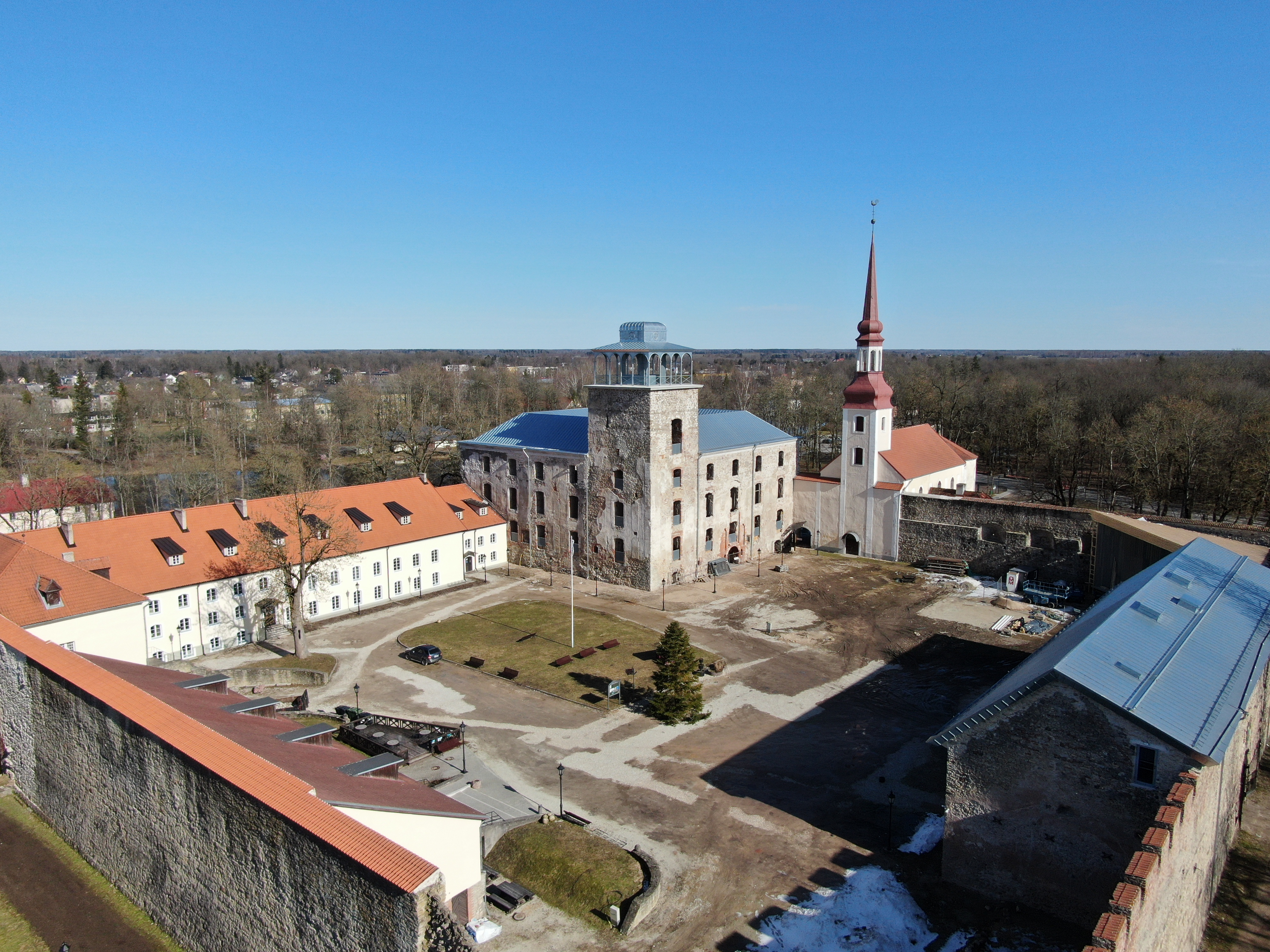

Site information
- Type: Order castle (ruin)

Location
- Location of Põltsamaa Castle in Estonia
- Coordinates: 58.655277°N 25.976944°E

Site history
- Built: 1272
- Built by: Livonian Order

Drone video of Põltsamaa river and castle in October 2021

Põltsamaa Castle (Estonian: Põltsamaa linnus; German: Schloss Oberpahlen), also Põltsamaa Order Castle, (Estonian: Põltsamaa ordulinnus), is a castle in Põltsamaa, Jõgeva County, in eastern Estonia.

== History ==
The castle was founded by the Livonian Order in 1272, as a purely defensive crusader fortress. During the course of the Livonian War, the castle was for a period occupied by Polish troops and between 1570 and 1578 served as the official residence of Duke Magnus of Holstein, who aspired to create a Livonian kingdom with the help of Tsar Ivan the Terrible of Russia.

In 1623, king Gustavus Adolphus of Sweden gave the estate to Field Marshal Herman Wrangel as a gift. Wrangel started to transform the castle from a medieval fortress into a stately late-renaissance home. During the course of the Great Northern War, however, the castle was burnt and the interiors destroyed. After the war, Emperor Peter the Great in his turn gave the castle as a gift to reformer Heinrich von Fick. Through inheritance, it eventually passed into the ownership of Woldemar Johann von Lauw in 1750. He began an extensive rebuilding scheme, transforming the fortress into a luxurious rococo palace. After his time, it eventually ended up in the hands of the Russian princely family Gagarin in whose hands it remained until the Estonian land reform of 1919.

In 1941, during the Second World War, the castle was almost completely destroyed in an air raid.

== Architecture ==
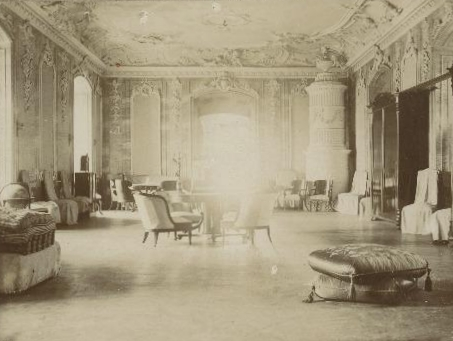
The lavishly decorated Rococo "marble hall", destroyed in 1941.

The medieval castle was built on the banks of Põltsamaa River, and is surrounded by a moat. It was a square fortress with three gates and an inner courtyard. In the 14th and 15th centuries several additions were made, for example was a convent hall added and the walls raised successively. Small rectangular towers stood at three of the corners of the wall. The inner convent building had its own, inner courtyard and a watchtower in the south-west corner. In the 16th century, a bastion and a cannon tower was added in front of the southern gate. A cannon tower was also added to protect the northern gate. During the ownership of Herman Wrangel, the castle started to change appearance; it was slowly transformed from a fortress into a residence. Wrangel had fireplaces and tiled stoves put in place, enlarged the windows and doors and added an extra floor to the building. The courtyard was also transformed into a household yard. The most visible legacy of his reconstruction scheme, however, is that he transformed the southern cannon tower into the present-day church, which is still standing.

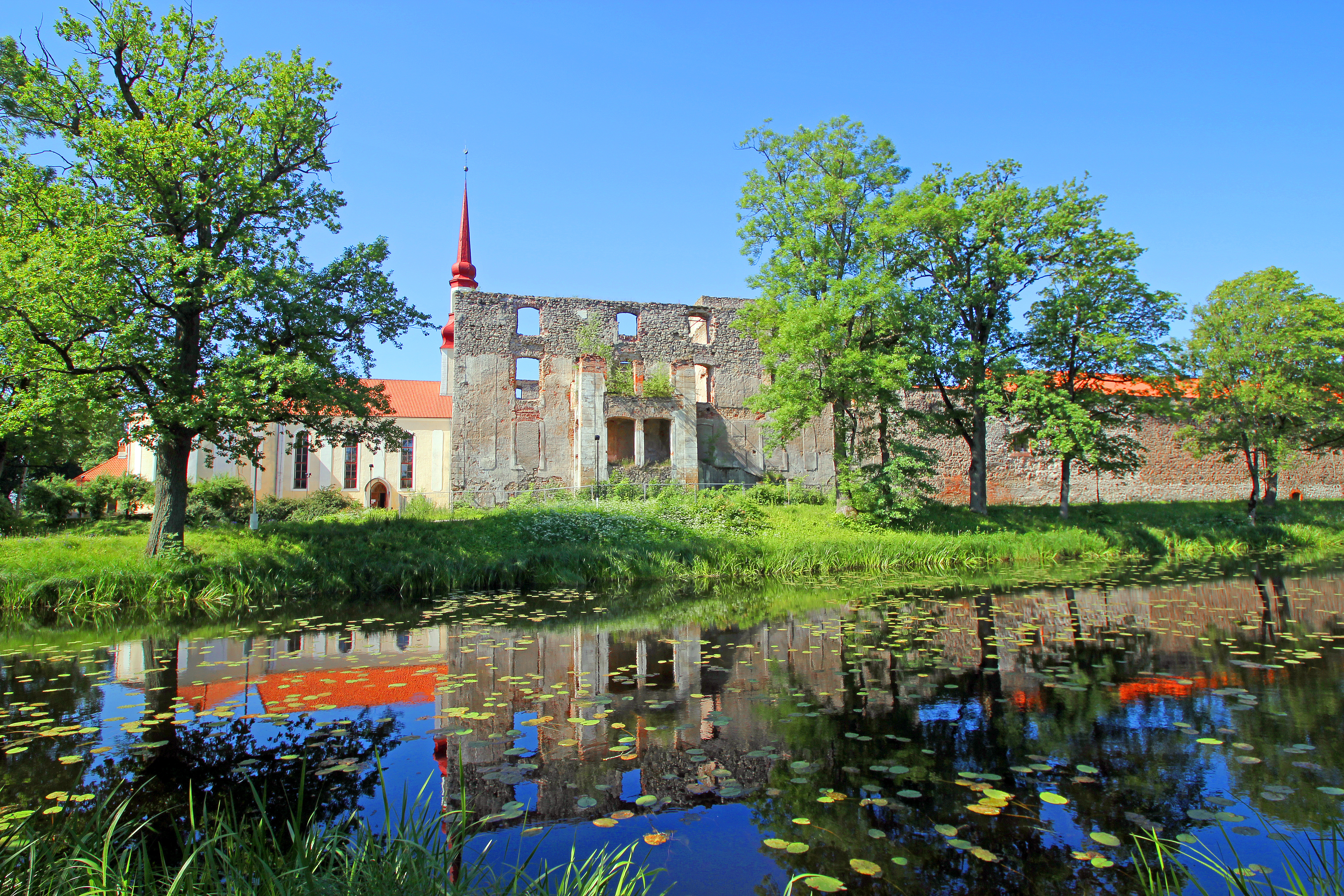
Põltsamaa castle viewed from the north-east

During the Great Northern War the castle was burnt and the interiors largely destroyed. However, in 1772–73 the interior was re-decorated in a lavish rococo style, perhaps the most artistically accomplished rococo interior in all of Estonia. Master stucco decorator Johann Michael Graff, whose craftsmanship can still be admired in Rundāle Palace, Latvia, was engaged in the creation of these interiors. During this time Gottlieb Welté was probably also active as an artist at Põltsamaa castle.

In the 1941 bombing, the castle was almost disintegrated. Today, only ruins remain of the main buildings. The church, although also damaged, has been restored, as have some of the annexes.

== See also ==
- History of Estonia
- Livonian Order
