= Pavel Andreyevich Shuvalov =

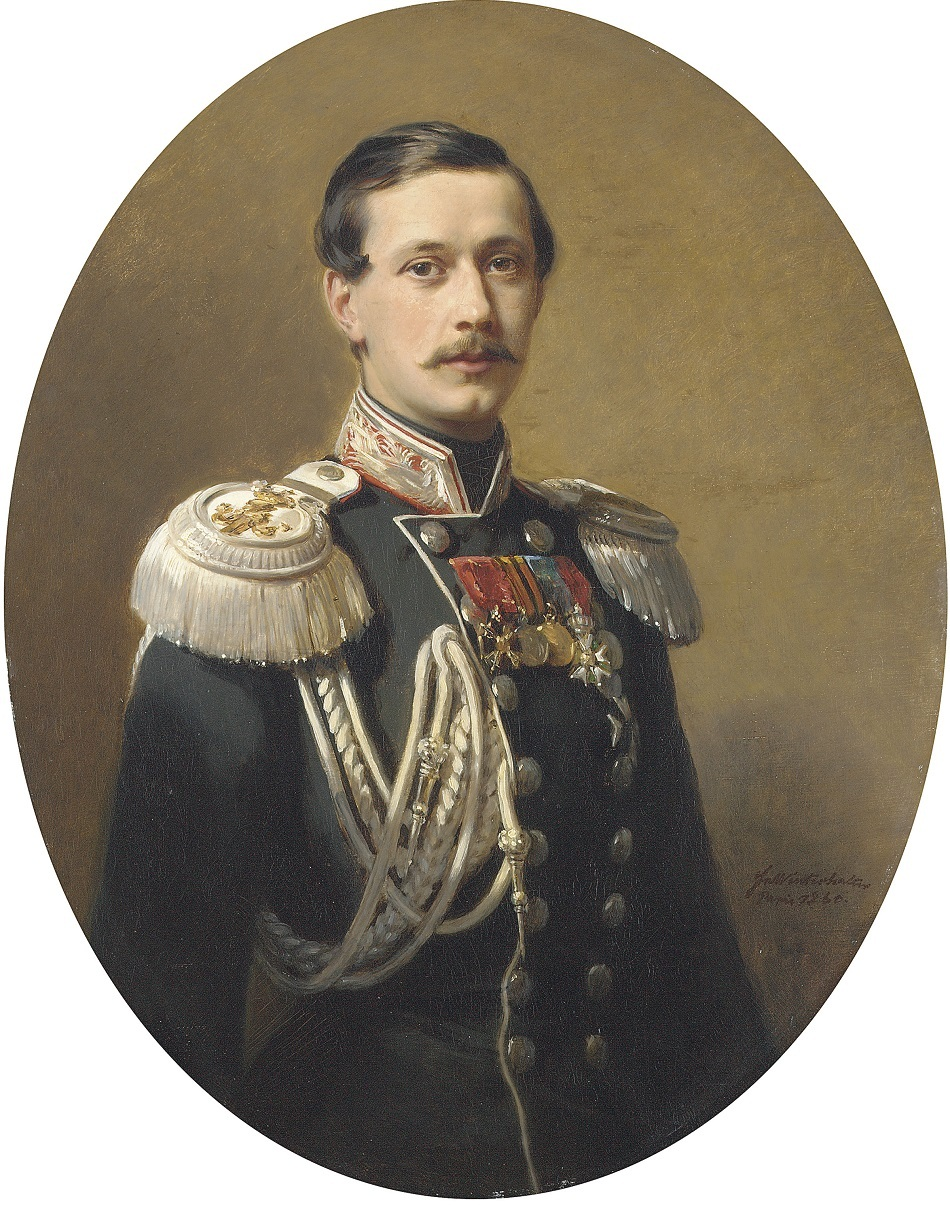
Count Shuvalov by Franz Xaver Winterhalter (1860)

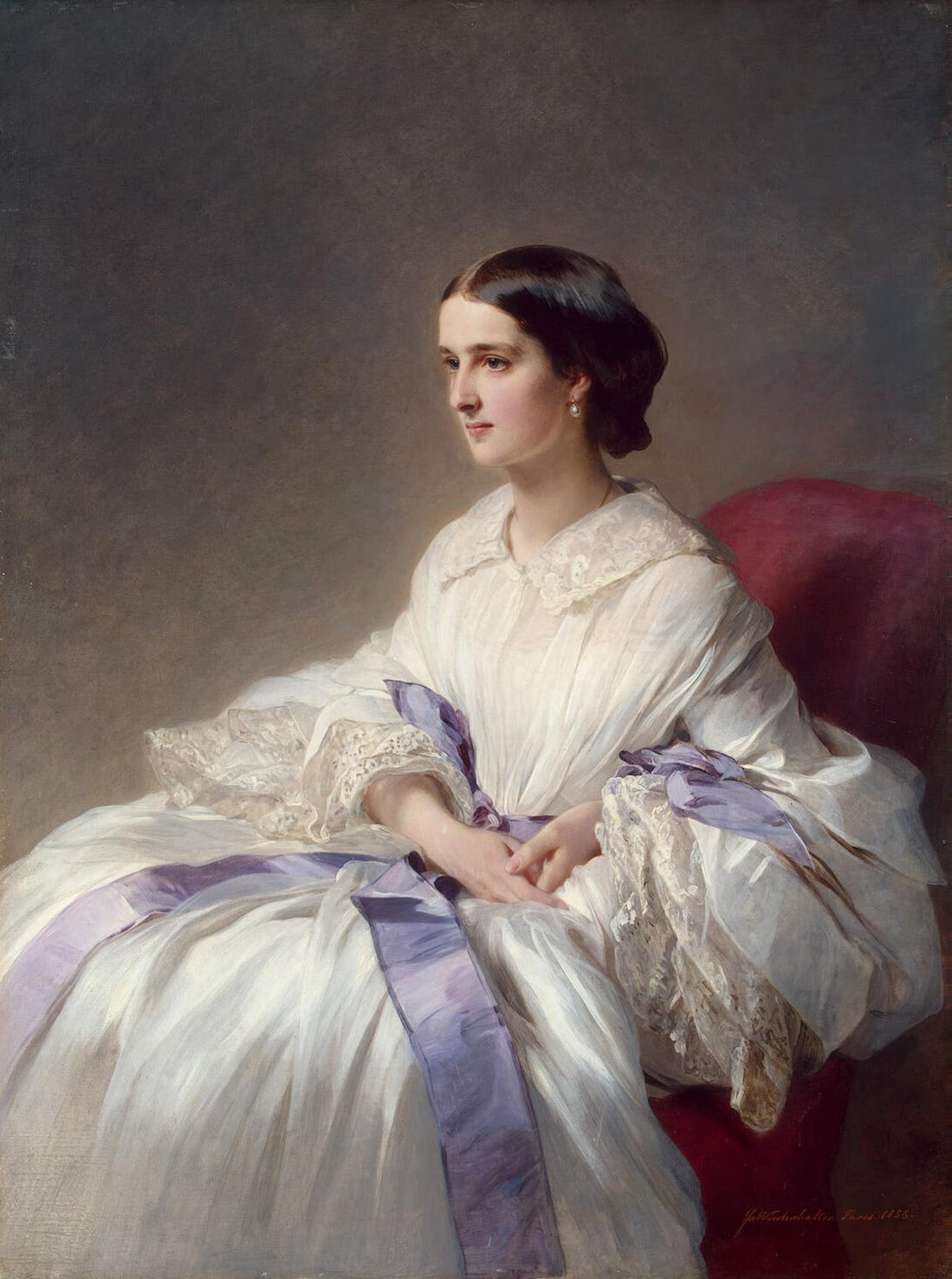
Portrait of Olga Esperovna Beloselskaya-Belozerskaya by Franz Xaver Winterhalter (1858)

Count Pavel Andreyevich Shuvalov (Russian: Па́вел Андре́евич Шува́лов; Leipzig/Saint Petersburg, 25 November [O.S. 13 November] 1830 – Yalta, 20 April [O.S. 7 April] 1908) was an Imperial Russian statesman and the brother of Count Pyotr Andreyevich Shuvalov.

== Biography ==
Pavel Andreyevich came from the Shuvalov family which has been prominent in the Russian culture and politics since the mid-18th century. His father, Count Andrey Petrovich Shuvalov, was a prominent figure at the courts of Nicholas I of Russia and Alexander II of Russia. His mother was Thekla Ignatyevna Walentinowicz, Prince Zubov's widow and heiress. Count Pyotr Andreyevich Shuvalov was his brother. Rundāle Palace was notable family estate.

After completing his studies in the Page Corps, Paul served with distinction in the Crimean War. His military career was fairly successful and peaked with the high rank of full General. During the Russo-Turkish War (1877–1878) he was in charge of the staff of the imperial guards and of the Petersburg Military District. From 1885 to 1894, he was the Ambassador at Berlin, bringing an end to a toll war between Russia and the German Empire in 1894, as well as concluding the Reinsurance Treaty with Otto von Bismarck. For the following two years he served as Governor-general of Warsaw. Shuvalov retired from office in 1896 and spent the rest of his life in Yalta.

== Marriages and issue ==
He married firstly at Saint Petersburg on 25 July 1855 Princess Olga Esperovna Beloselskaya-Belozerskaya (17 February 1838 – 9 December 1869), daughter of Prince Esper Alexandrovich Beloselsky-Belozersky (Saint Petersburg, 27 December 1802 – Saint Petersburg, 15 June 1846) and wife Yelena Pavlovna Bibikova (September 1812 – 15 February 1888), and had issue.

He married secondly at Rundāle Palace on 7 January 1877 Maria Alexandrovna Komarova-Lukash (Yvelines, Versailles, 9 March 1855 – Copenhagen, 28 April 1928), daughter of Professor Alexander Sergeievich Komarov and wife Maria Nikolaievna Lukash (c. 1830 – ?), daughter of Nikolai Yevgenyevich Lukash (11 December 1796 – Moscow, [O.S. 20 January] 1868) and wife Princess Alexandra Lukanichna Guidianova (26 May 1804 – 23 February 1832/4), and had issue.

== See also ==
- Rundāle Palace
- Shuvalov family

== Sources ==
- Jacques Ferrand. Descendances naturelles des souverains et grands-ducs de Russie de 1792 á 1910; Paris, 1995.
- Jacques Ferrand. Aperçu généalogique sur quelques descendances naturelles de grands-ducs des russie au XIXème siècle; Montreuil, 1982
- Jacques Ferrand. Les familles princières de l’ancien Empire de Russie, Vol. 2; 1979–1982
