= Lazistan Khanate =

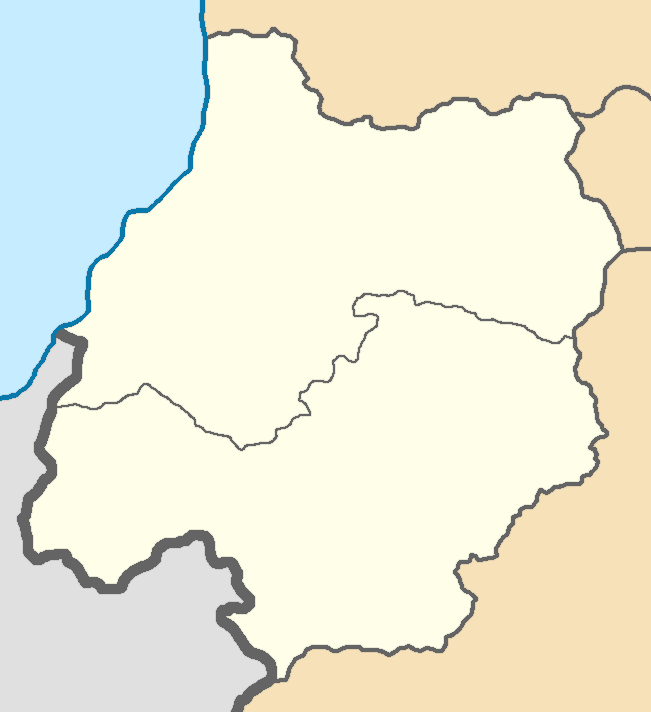
Proposed region for the Lazistan Khanate

The Lazistan Khanate was a proposed buffer state suggested by the United Kingdom during the Congress of Berlin in 1878. The proposal envisioned the establishment of an autonomous or even independent state in the historical region of Lazistan. It aimed to resolve disputes regarding the status of Batum and its surrounding areas, which had been ceded to the Russian Empire after the Russo-Turkish War. The proposed state, predominantly Muslim and under international supervision, was intended to limit Russian influence along the southeastern coast of the Black Sea. The khanate was based on the recognition of the ethnic and religious distinctiveness of the Laz Muslims. It is considered one of the earliest diplomatic examples of using "national principles" as a basis for proposing a new state. The proposal was briefly discussed in diplomatic circles but was eventually dropped without implementation.

== History ==
After the Treaty of San Stefano that ended the 1877–1878 war, Batum and parts of the Sanjak of Lazistan were ceded to Russia. This created a diplomatically contentious situation concerning the region's future. During the Congress of Berlin held in June–July 1878, the United Kingdom put forth several proposals aimed at curbing Russian expansion along the Black Sea coast.

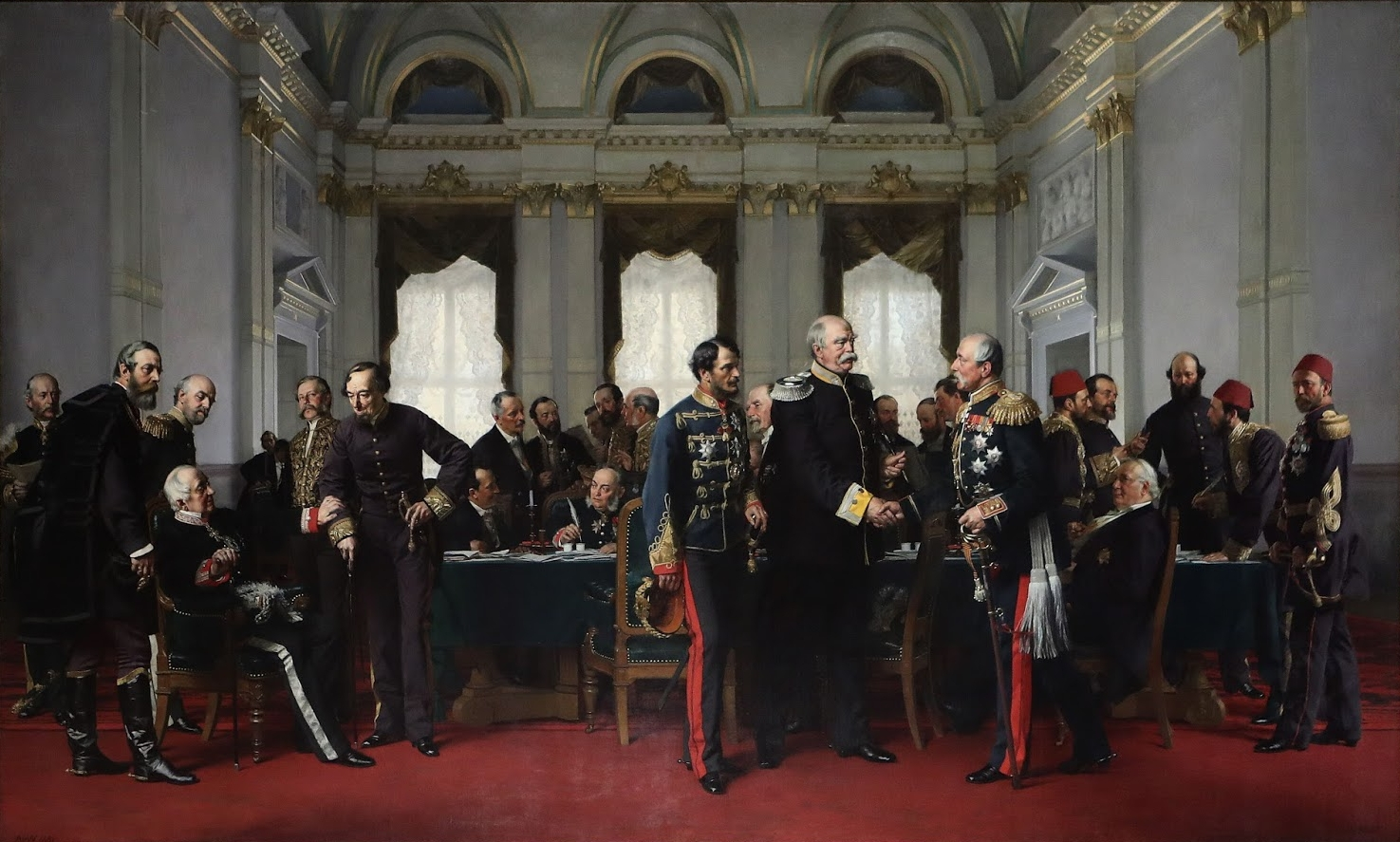
Painting by Anton von Werner depicting the Congress of Berlin (1881). Center: Otto von Bismarck, Gyula Andrássy (Austria-Hungary), and Pyotr Shuvalov (Russia). Left: Alexander Gorchakov and Benjamin Disraeli (UK). Right: Sadullah Pasha, Alexander Karatheodori Pasha, and Mehmed Ali Pasha (marshal)

=== British Proposal ===
On June 27, 1878, British Foreign Secretary Lord Salisbury presented the following proposal to Russian envoy Pyotr Shuvalov:

- Batum would be declared a free port, demilitarized with no naval base allowed;
- The region would be governed by a local Muslim Khan of Laz origin, providing an autonomous administration for the Muslim population;
- Russia would have transit rights through the khanate’s territory for troop movement and road construction but would not be allowed to station troops permanently;
- The United Kingdom would facilitate the evacuation of Ottoman troops from Batum and Varna.

These provisions aimed to create a buffer state to restrain Russian expansion.

=== Russian Reaction ===
Russia did not support the proposal. Pyotr Shuvalov indicated that it would need to be submitted to Saint Petersburg and was unlikely to be approved. He also noted that a compromise had already been reached between Alexander Gorchakov and Benjamin Disraeli to declare Batum a free port, which weakened Salisbury’s proposal. As a result, the idea of a Lazistan Khanate was shelved. Batum was handed over to Russia with free port status. The Ottoman administration of Lazistan relocated its administrative center to Rize.

=== Initiatives by Laz Nobles ===
In 1878, a group of Laz nobles appealed to the United Kingdom to take Lazistan under its protection. In exchange, they pledged to send a 4,000-man force to support Britain in the ongoing war in Afghanistan. Petitions were sent to Queen Victoria, Lord Salisbury, and the Mayor of London. However, these appeals were not answered.

== Aftermath of the Berlin Treaty ==
Following the Treaty of Berlin (1878), the Ottoman Empire ceded Batum, Kars, and Ardahan to Russia. As a result, many Laz people living in these newly ceded areas migrated to Ottoman territory, fearing repression under Russian rule. In September 1878, British Consul Alfred Biliotti reported the arrival of 2,000 Laz refugees in Trabzon, with an additional 1,000 expected. By 1882, it was estimated that up to 40,000 Laz had migrated to the Ottoman Empire. Most traveled by sea to Trabzon and then settled in various Anatolian cities such as Kocaeli, Sakarya, Bursa, and Samsun.
