= Kabala, Järva County =

Village in Estonia

Kabala
- Village
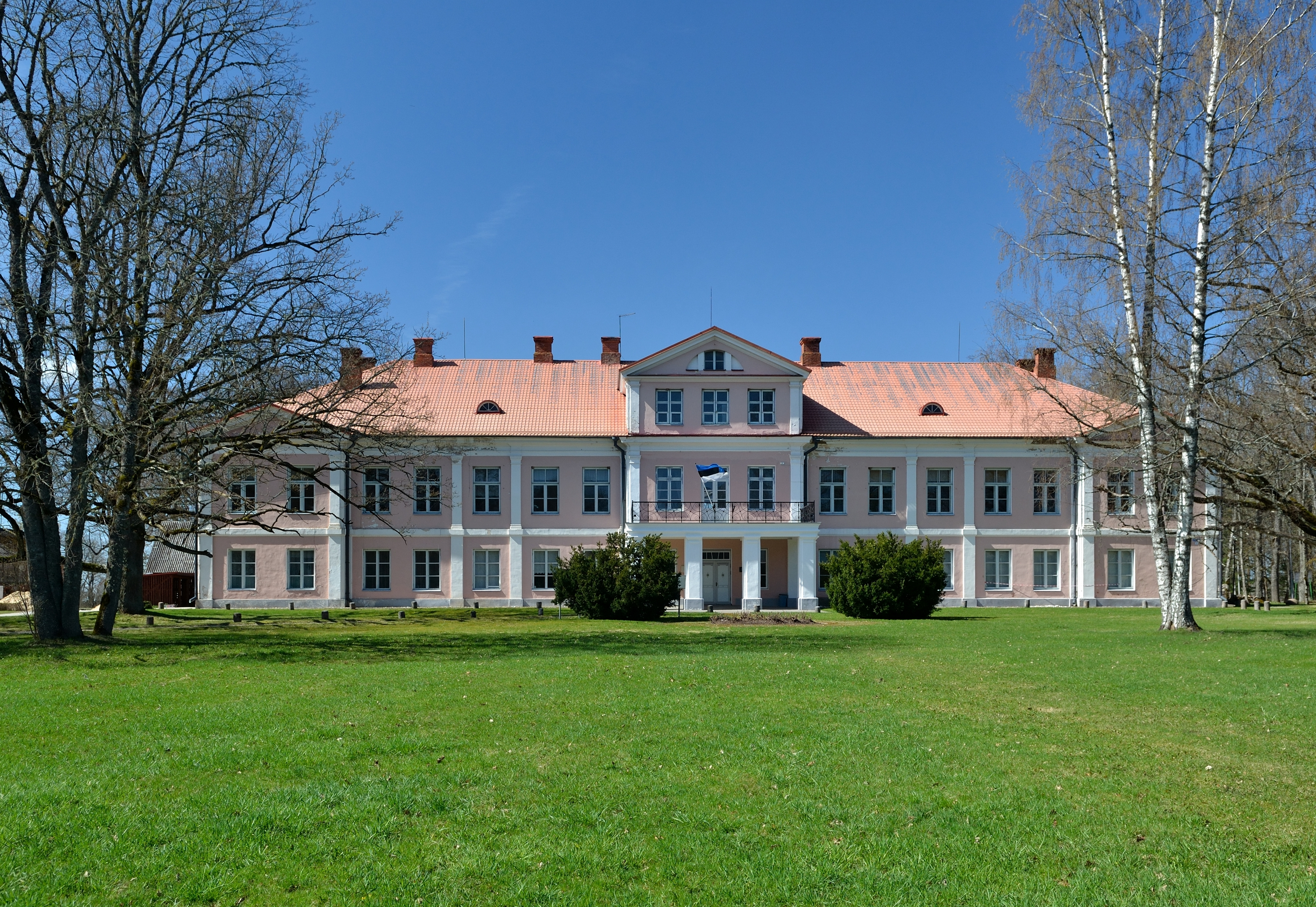
- Kabala manor

- Location in Estonia
- Coordinates: 58°41′28″N 25°37′57″E
- Country: Estonia
- County: Järva County
- Parish: Türi Parish
- Time zone: UTC+2 (EET)
  - Summer (DST): UTC+3 (EEST)

Kabala is a village in Türi Parish, Järva County in central Estonia. From 1991 to 2005 it was the administrative seat of Kabala Parish.

== Kabala manor ==
Kabala (German: Kabbal) became an independent manorial estate in 1638. It has belonged to several different Baltic German families. The present house was erected around 1770, when Hans Georg von Uexküll was the landowner, in a late Baroque style.

The building still contains some very fine examples of original baroque and rococo interiors. These include two fine tiled stoves as well as stucco decorations, some of them possibly executed by master stucco craftsman Johann Michael Graff, who is famous for his extraordinary work at Rundāle Palace in Latvia. In the 19th century, further additions to the interior were made, such as the study with its richly carved and decorated wainscoting, neo-baroque stoves and stair balusters.

Jüri Lossmann, a long distance runner and silver medalist in the marathon at the 1920 Summer Olympics (1891–1984) was born in Kabala manor.

== See also ==
- List of palaces and manor houses in Estonia
