= Johann Michael Graff =

Johann Michael Graff (Latvian: Johans Mihaels Grafs; sometimes also Johann Michael Graaf, Johann Michael Graaff, Johann Michael Graf or Johann Michael Kraff, fl. c. 1765-68), was a German Rococo sculptor and plasterer. Among his most celebrated decorations are those at Schönhausen Palace, Germany, and Rundāle Palace, Latvia.

Graff came from a family of stucco decorators from Bavaria who were members of the so-called Wessobrunner School. He seems to have moved to Brandenburg at some point, where he was influenced by the decorative style predominant in and around Berlin. He very probably made decorations for Schönhausen Palace before being hired by the Duke of Courland, Peter von Biron, to decorate his residences in present-day Latvia. He is known to have decorated Jelgava Palace (decorations destroyed during World War II) and Rundāle Palace for the Duke. In present-day Estonia, he also made lavish stucco decorations for Põltsamaa Castle (destroyed during World War II), and possibly at Kabala Manor.

== Gallery ==
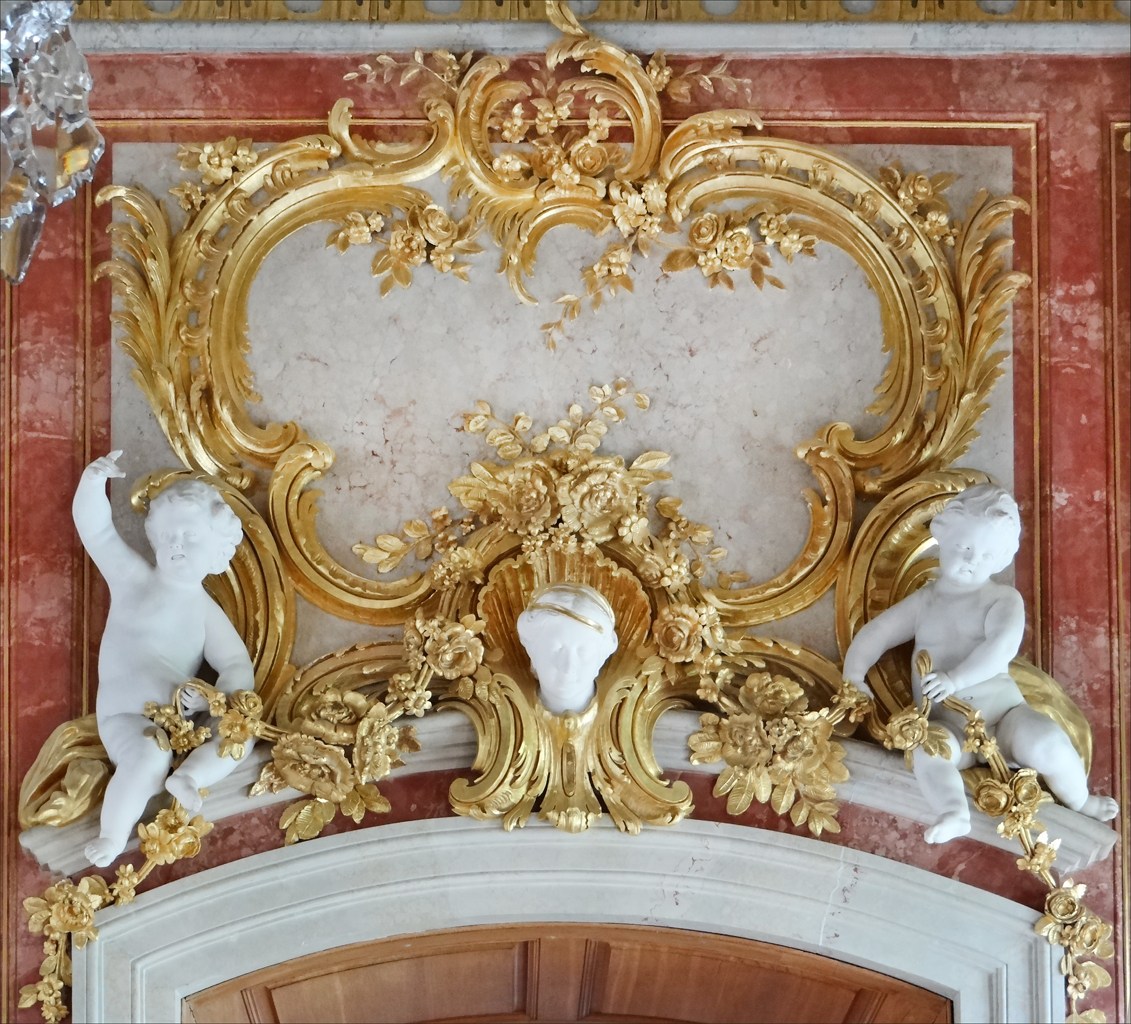
Stucco decoration by Johann Michael Graff in Rundāle Palace, Latvia

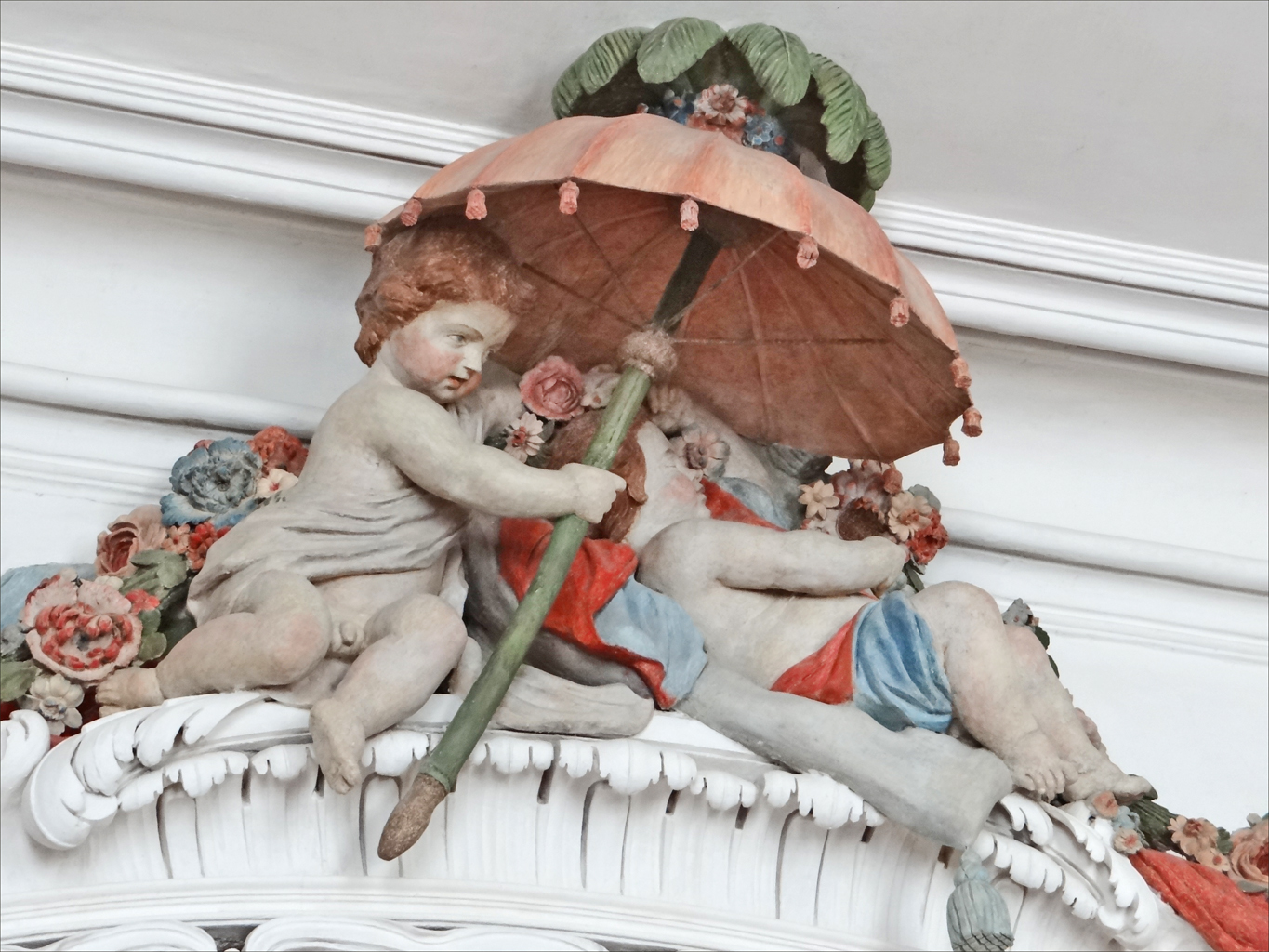
Stucco decoration by Johann Michael Graff in Rundāle Palace, Latvia

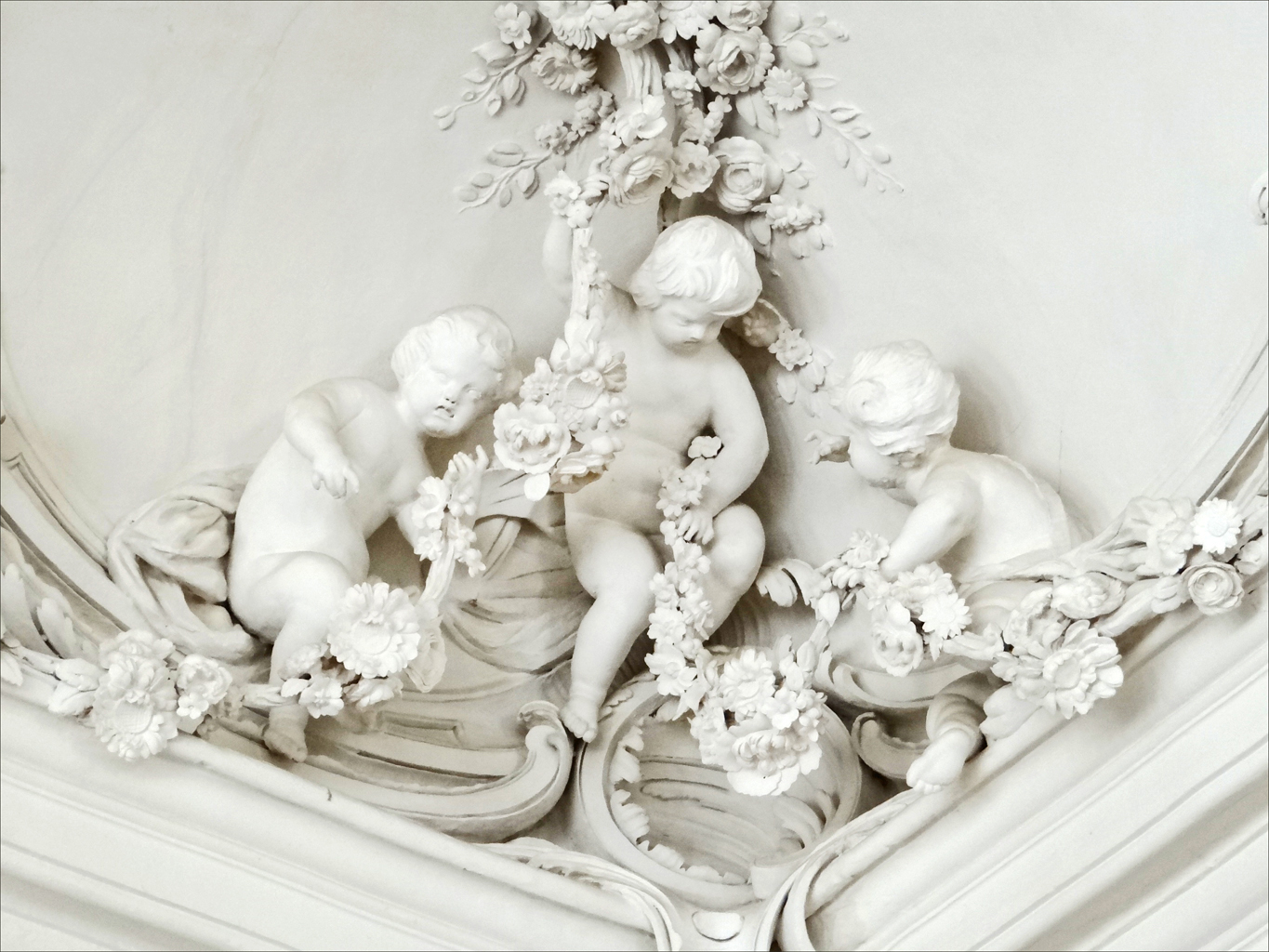
Stucco decoration by Johann Michael Graff in Rundāle Palace, Latvia

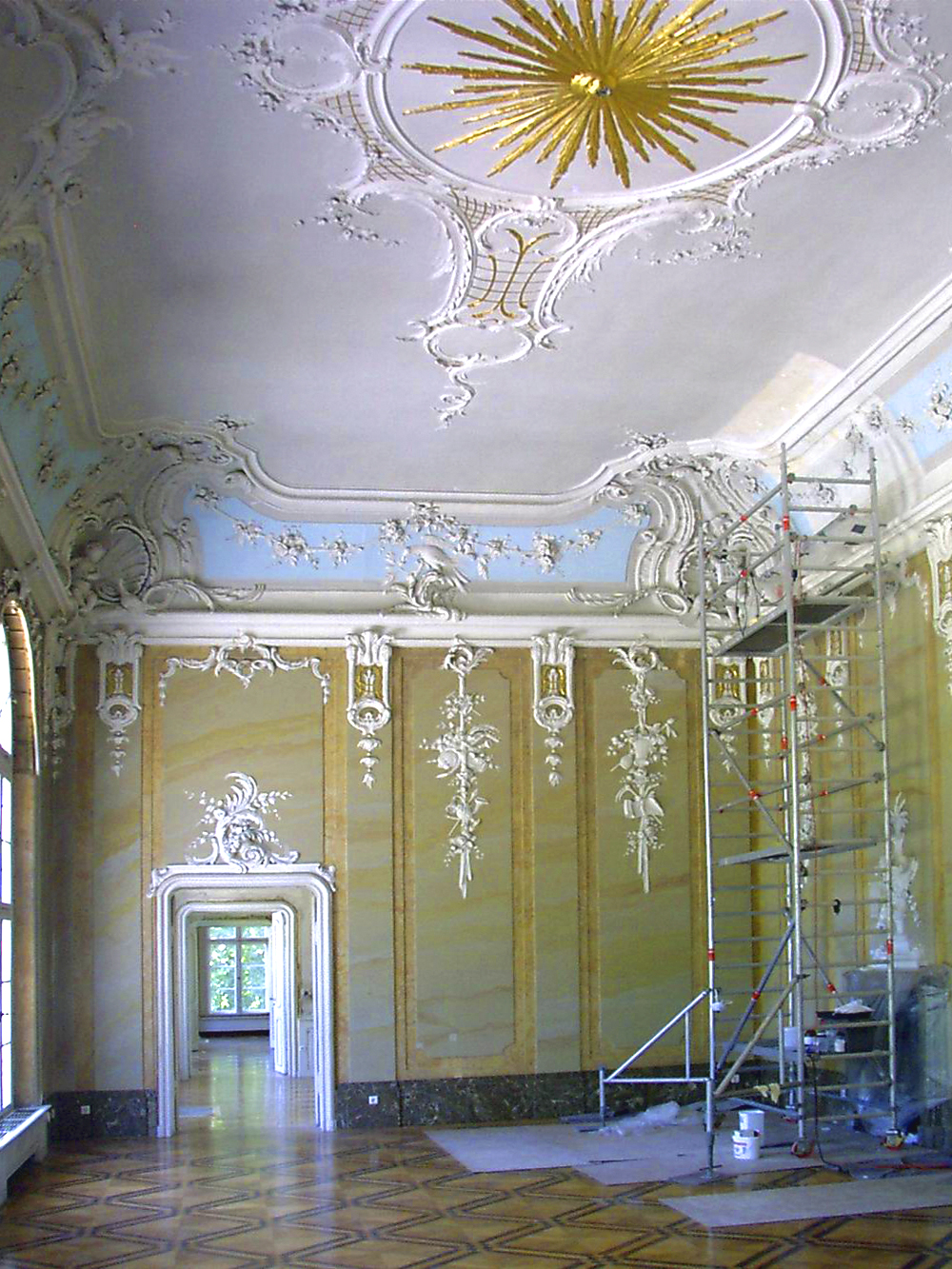
Stucco decoration by Johann Michael Graff in Schönhausen Palace, Germany

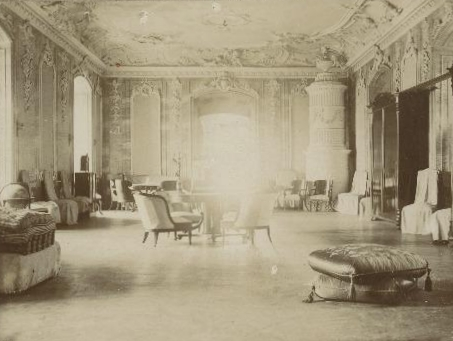
Stucco decoration by Johann Michael Graff in Põltsamaa Castle, Estonia (destroyed)
