= Pyotr Andreyevich Shuvalov =

Russian Statesman

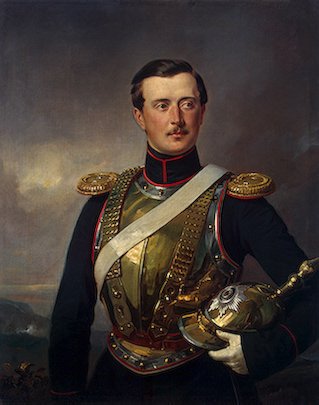
Pyotr Shuvalov in 1850.

Count Pyotr Andreyevich Shuvalov (Russian: Граф Пётр Андре́евич Шува́лов) (27 July 1827, Saint Petersburg – 22 March 1889, Saint Petersburg) was an influential Russian statesman and a counselor to Tsar Alexander II.

== Biography ==
Pyotr Andreyevich came from the Shuvalov family which has been prominent in the Russian culture and politics since the mid-18th century. His father, Count Andrey Petrovich Shuvalov, was a prominent figure at the courts of Nicholas I of Russia and Alexander II of Russia. His mother was Thekla Ignatyevna Walentinowicz, Prince Zubov's widow and heiress. Count Pavel Andreyevich Shuvalov was his brother. Rundāle Palace was notable family estate.

After graduating from the Corps of Pages, Pyotr Shuvalov rose through the ranks of Alexander II's retinue, making wing adjutant, major general of the retinue and adjutant general in short order. In 1857 he was put in charge of the Saint Petersburg police and went to France for training.

In 1860 Shuvalov was appointed director of the Department of General Affairs of the Ministry of Internal Affairs and, in 1861, was made Chief of Staff of the Special Corps of Gendarmes. He proposed for the Corps to be abolished, which contributed to his reputation as a liberal and an Anglophile. His plan was rejected, and he resigned in late 1861. He served elsewhere in the early 1860s and, in 1864, was appointed governor-general of the Baltic region.

After Dmitry Karakozov's unsuccessful attempt to assassinate Alexander II in April 1866, Shuvalov was made Chief of Gendarmes and Executive Head of the Third Section of His Imperial Majesty's Own Chancellery, a ministerial position at the time. He formed a group of similarly-minded moderate ministers (A. P. Bobrinsky, S. A. Greig, K. I. Pahlen, Dmitriy Tolstoy) and, with the help of the Tsar's confidant Field Marshal Aleksandr Baryatinskiy, pursued a policy of moderate reform. Politically, he was simultaneously opposed to the Slavophiles and the so-called Russian Party as well as to the more liberal reformers like Minister of War Dmitry Milyutin and Grand Duke Konstantin Nikolayevich.

Shuvalov was in favor of developing local self-government but on the basis of strengthening the political position of the landed gentry. In the long run, he envisioned a system of national representation with a constitution and a bicameral parliament, modelled on the earlier aristocratic English model, but he disclosed his parliamentary ideas only in 1881, when he had safely retired:

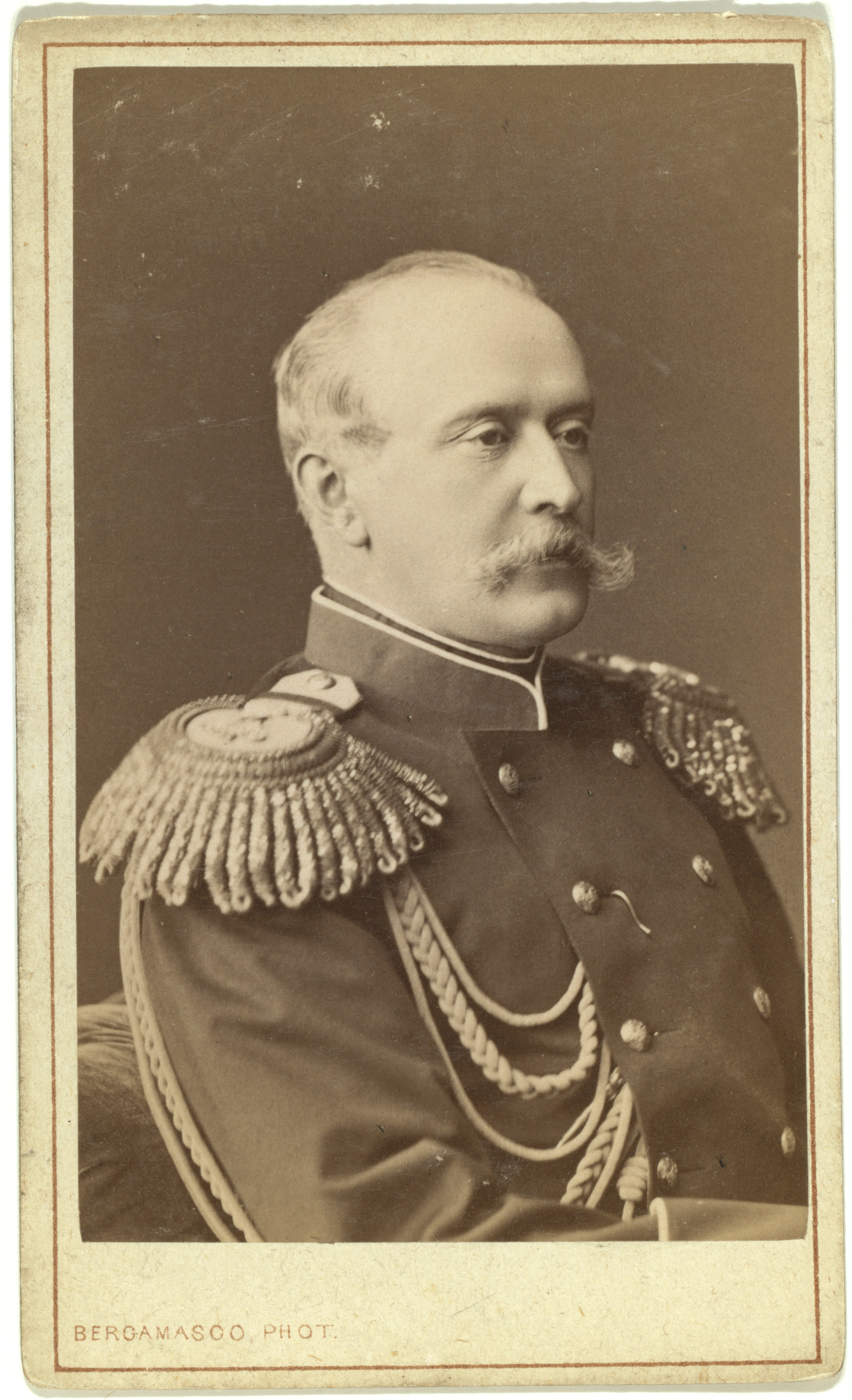
Pyotr Shuvalov

an advisory assembly can bring no benefit whatsoever. One must openly introduce a constitutional system by establishing two houses and giving them a decisive voice. If this cannot be done immediately, one must, at least, erect a foundation upon which real representative government could eventually arise.

Shuvalov continued his predecessors' reforms although more cautiously. He reorganized zemstvos in 1870 and overhauled the military in 1874, reducing the length of service from 15 years to 6. At the same time, he strengthened the government's censorship system and limited the zemstvos' taxation powers. In 1872, he was promoted General of the Cavalry (1872), a rank equivalent to full General in other armies.

In 1873, Shuvalov was sent to London on a mission to arrange a marriage between Grand Duchess Marie Alexandrovna of Russia and the Duke of Edinburgh. The mission was a success and the two married in January 1874. Shuvalov was also supposed to reassure the British government that Alexander II had no plans to conquer the Central Asian Khanate of Khiva. Although Khiva fell to Russian troops in 1874, he was able to blame it on the generals' excess of zeal and so it did not damage Shuvalov's reputation in London.

In April 1874, the Committee of Ministers approved the creation of an experimental commission with representation from Zemstvo, local gentry and cities. Although the commission was charged only with reviewing a single previously prepared bill on hiring agricultural laborers, the very notion was apparently deemed so radical that in November 1874, Shuvalov was sent into honorary exile as ambassador to London. However, other more mundane explanations for his downfall, boasting about his influence on the tsar or making an incautious remark about his mistress Catherine Dolgorukov, have also been suggested.

Shuvalov played an important role in the negotiations between Russia and Great Britain during and after the Russo-Turkish War, 1877-1878 and was instrumental in avoiding conflict between the two powers after the Treaty of San Stefano. With the conclusion of the Treaty of Berlin, 1878, Russian public opinion turned against him since he was seen as too conciliatory and too willing to yield to British and especially German demands. Although Alexander II at first resisted public pressure to remove Shuvalov, further deterioration of Russo-German relations in 1879 forced him into retirement.

== Notes ==
- See Richard S. Wortman. Scenarios of Power: Myth and Ceremony in Russian Monarchy. Volume Two: From Alexander to the Abdication of Nicholas II, Princeton University Press, 2000, ISBN 0-691-02947-4 p. 114
- See:
  - Peter Waldron. The End of Imperial Russia, 1855-1917, St. Martin's Press, 1997, ISBN 0-312-16537-4 p. 16
  - Valentina G. Chernukha and Boris V. Anan'ich. "Russia Falls Back, Russia Catches Up: Three Generations of Russian Reformers" in Reform in Modern Russian History: Progress Or Cycle?, tr. and ed. Theodore Taranovski, Cambridge University Press, 1995, ISBN 0-521-45177-9 (Papers from a conference entitled "Reform in Russian and Soviet History -- Its Meaning and Function" held May 5-May 7, 1990, organized by the Kennan Institute for Advanced Russian Studies of the Woodrow Wilson International Center for Scholars), p. 73-74
- See Walter Moss. Alexander II and His Times: A Narrative History of Russia in the Age of Alexander II, Tolstoy, and Dostoevsky, Anthem Press, 2002, ISBN 1-898855-59-5, 295p. Part III
- See Thomas S. Pearson. Russian Officialdom in Crisis: Autocracy and Local Self-Government, 1861-1900, Cambridge University Press, 1989, paperback edition 2004, ISBN 0-521-89446-8 p. 38
- See Adam Bruno Ulam. Prophets and Conspirators in Pre-Revolutionary Russia, Transaction Publishers, New Brunswick, NJ, 1998 (2nd expanded edition), ISBN 0-7658-0443-3 pp. 173–174.
- See Peter Julicher. Renegades, Rebels and Rogues Under the Tsars, McFarland & Company, Jefferson, NC, 2003, ISBN 0-7864-1612-2 p. 188.
