= Baltā māja =

National architectural monument

Coordinates: 56°24′57″N 24°01′49″E

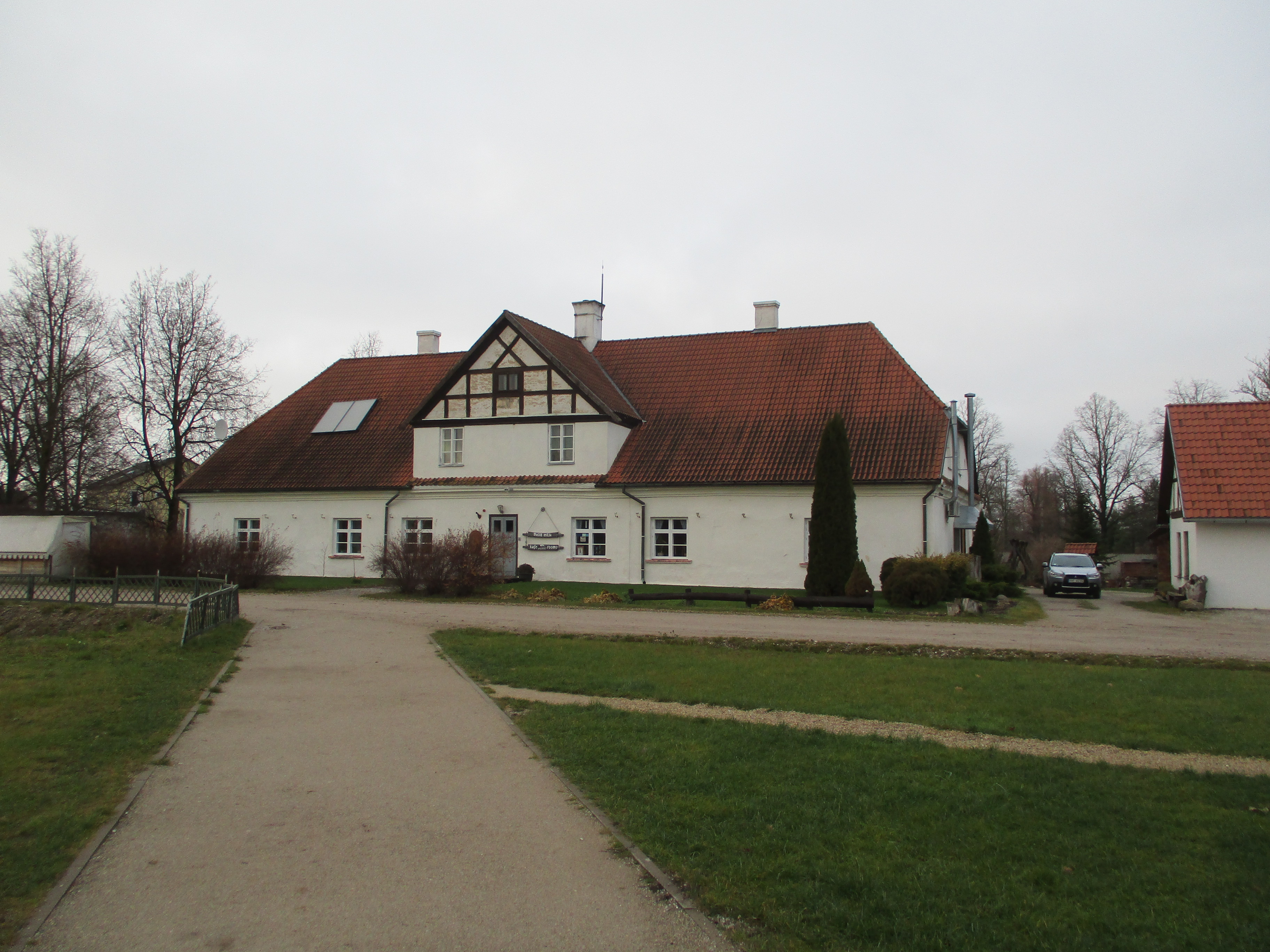

- Location within Latvia

General information
- Architectural style: Classicism
- Location: Rundāle parish, Rundāle municipality, Latvia
- Completed: around 1800

Baltā māja (English: White House) is a national architectural monument in Latvia. Part of the Rundāle Palace complex.

Building is slightly younger than palace. It was built around 1800 as a residence for the servants of Rundāle Palace. From 1949 the building was property of Rundale consumer associations and Bauska district consumer association, when in the "White House" were a shop and residential premises. In 1997 "White House" became an Ikertu family property, which is now a guest house.
