= Kabala Parish =

Former municipality of Estonia

Kabala Parish Kabala vald
- Former municipality of Estonia
- Interactive map of Kabala Parish
- Coordinates: 58.6833°N 25.6333°E
- Country: Estonia
- Administrative centre: Kabala

Kabala Parish (Estonian: Kabala vald) was a rural municipality of Estonia, in Järva County. Before 1950, the parish belonged to Viljandi County. In 1990s, the parish was re-established. The parish was liquidated on 30 June 2005.
