= Imants Lancmanis =

Latvian painter and art historian (born 1941)

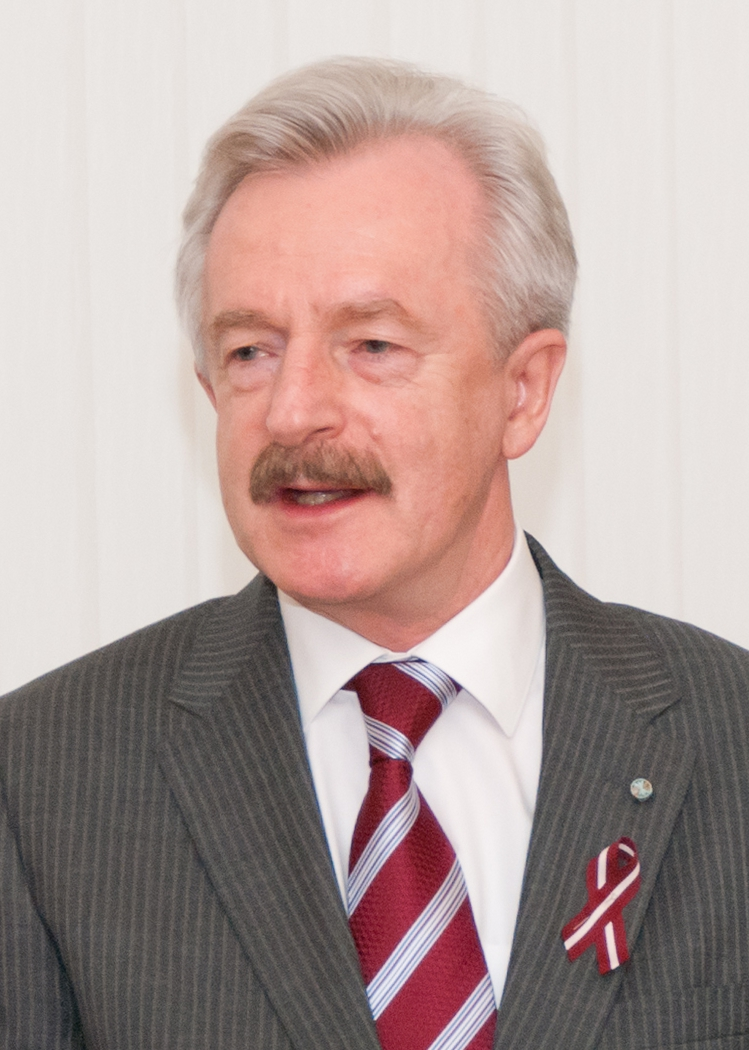
- Lancmanis in 2011
- Born: July 29, 1941 (age 85); Riga, Reichskomissariat Ostland (Now: Latvia)
- Education: Art Academy of Latvia
- Occupations: Art historian, Museum director
- Spouse: Ieva Lancmane (1943-2004)

Imants Lancmanis (born July 29, 1941) is a Latvian painter and art historian. He has also been the director of Rundāle Palace Museum from 1976 until 2019.

== Biography ==
Imants Lancmanis was born on July 29, 1941, in Riga. In 1959 he graduated from J. Rozentāls Art High School and continued his studies in the painting department of the Art Academy of Latvia. In the 1960s as an Art Academy student, he visited Rundāle Palace for the first time. Later he met the director of the Bauska Local History Museum, Laimonis Liepa, who offered him an opportunity to work in the newly established Rundāle Palace Museum. After graduation in 1966 Lancmanis started his full-time job in Rundāle Palace.

In 1972 Lancmanis became deputy director of Rundāle Palace museum and director in 1976. He has been primarily responsible for reconstruction and restoration work done in the palace from the 1970s until 2014. Lancmanis has also extensively researched art history in Latvia. He is an author of several books about baroque architecture and 18th- and 19th-century art in Latvia. Due to his long career and experience, Lancmanis is one of the biggest experts on art history, architecture, heraldry and Baltic German heritage in Latvia.

Lancmanis is known also as a painter. During his studies in the Art Academy he mostly painted portraits and still lifes and envisioned his future as a painter. Later he dedicated most of his energy to the restoration of Rundāle Palace, although he resumed painting in 1989 and in 1999 his first solo exhibition was held in Riga.

For his work he has been awarded the Order of the Three Stars, Legion of Honour and several other decorations and prizes.

== Awards ==
- Order of the Three Stars (1994)
- Spīdola prize of Latvian Cultural fund. (1998)
- Legion of Honour
- Order of Merit of the Federal Republic of Germany
- Pro Europa prize of Cultural fund of Europe
- EU Prize for Cultural Heritage Europa Nostra
- Excellence Award in Culture (2019)
- Presidential Medal of Honour (2020)

== Selected bibliography ==
- Jelgavas pils, (Jelgava Palace), (1979), (1986)
- Liepāja no Baroka līdz Klasicismam, (Liepāja from baroque to classicism), (1984)
- Mežotnes pils, (Mežotne Palace), (1983)
- Rundāles pils, (Rundāle Palace) (1994)
- Kaucmindes pils, (Kaucminde Manor), (1999)
- Heraldika, (Heraldry), (2007)
- Rundāles pils I daļa. (Rundāle Palace, Part I), (2015)
