= Rundāle Palace =

Coordinates: 56.4138°N 24.0248°E

Rundale Palace
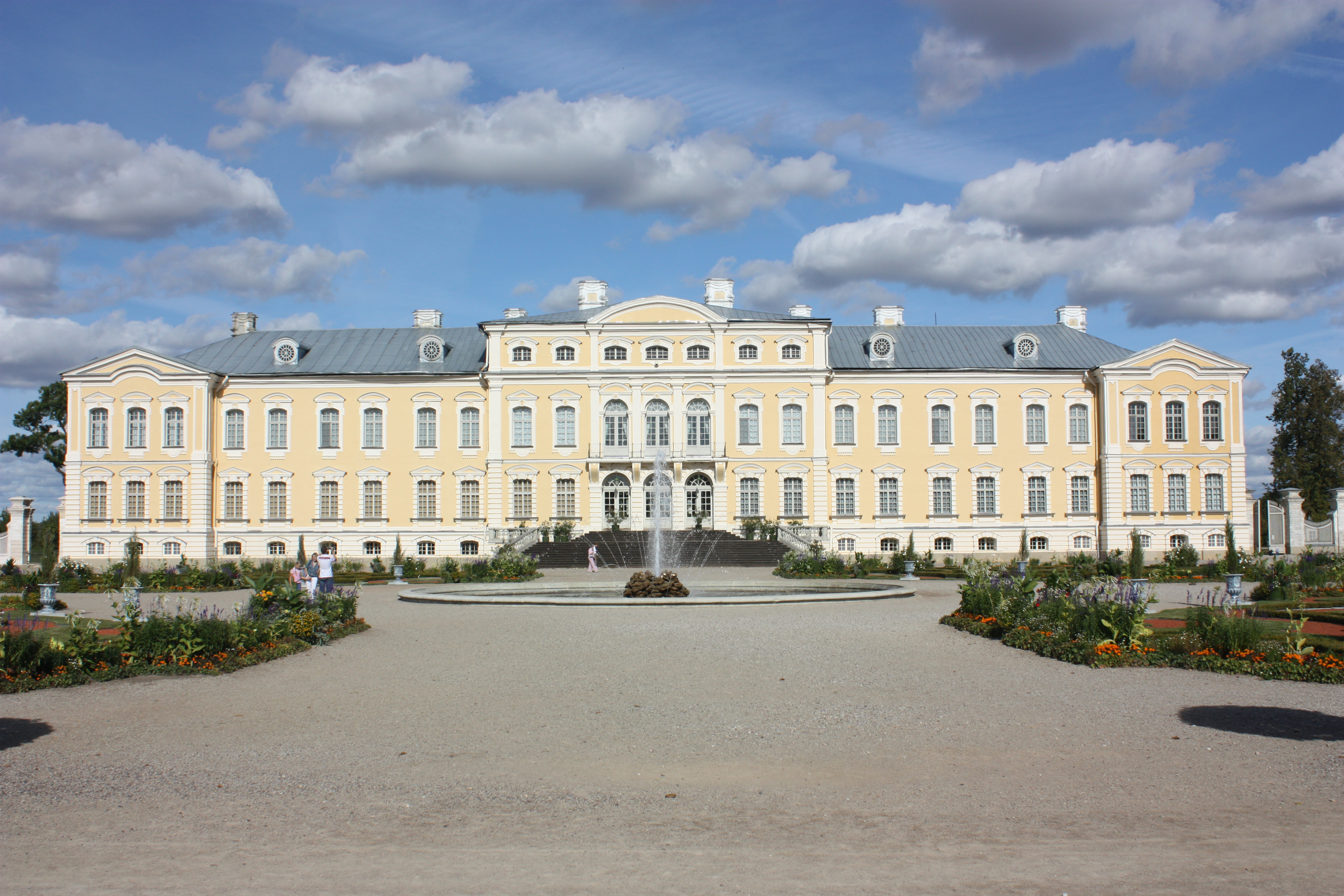
- Interactive map of the Rundale Palace area

General information
- Architectural style: Baroque
- Location: Bauska Municipality, Latvia
- Construction started: 1736
- Completed: 1768
- Client: Ernst Johann von Biron

Design and construction
- Architect: Bartolomeo Rastrelli

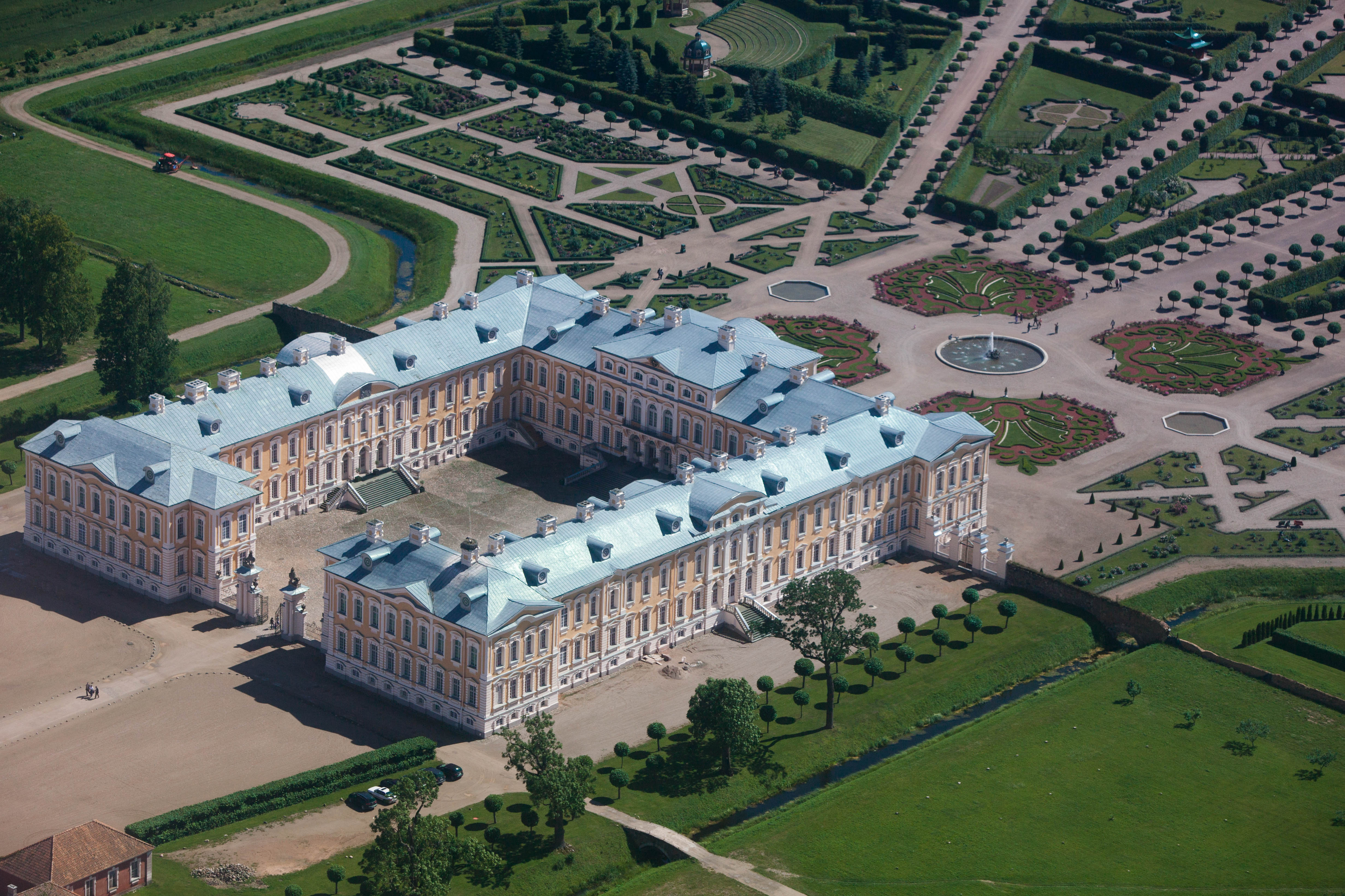
Aerial view of the palace and the gardens

Rundāle Palace (Latvian: Rundāles pils; German: Schloss Ruhental, formerly Ruhenthal or Ruhendahl) is one of the two major baroque palaces built for the Dukes of Courland in what is now Latvia, the other being Jelgava Palace. The palace was built in two periods, from 1736 until 1740 and from 1764 until 1768. It is situated at Pilsrundāle, in Rundāle Parish, Bauska Municipality in the Semigallia region, 12 km west of Bauska.

== History ==
In 1735, Duke of Courland Ernst Johann von Biron bought land in Rundāle with an old medieval castle in the territory of a planned summer residence. The old castle was demolished and constructed after the design of Bartolomeo Rastrelli started in 1736. Construction proceeded slowly because part of the materials and resources were transferred to the construction of Jelgava Palace, a project which was more important for the duke. Following Biron's fall from grace in 1740, the palace stood unfinished and empty until 1762, when Biron returned from his exile. Under the supervision of Rastrelli, its construction was finished in 1768. Johann Michael Graff produced lavish stucco decorations for the palace during this time. Ernst Johann von Biron loved the palace and moved there almost immediately in 1768. He often visited the palace and spent summers there until his death in 1772.

After the Duchy of Courland and Semigallia was absorbed by the Russian Empire in 1795, Catherine the Great presented the palace to Count Valerian Zubov, the youngest brother of her lover, Prince Platon Zubov. He spent his declining years there after the death of Valerian Zubov in 1804. His young widow, Thekla Walentinowicz, a local landowner's daughter, married Count Shuvalov, and the palace passed into the control of the Shuvalov family, with whom it remained until the German occupation in World War I, when the German army established a hospital and a commandant's office there. During the French invasion of Russia in 1812, the palace was used as a hospital for Napoleon's army. Several soldiers who died in this hospital were buried in the park of the palace. A monument has since been built there. At the end of the 19th century, the palace and park were restored and reconstructed.

The palace suffered serious damage in 1919 during the Latvian War of Independence. During their retreat, the Bermontians partially burned the palace. In 1920, after Latvian agrarian reforms, the palace became the property of the Ministry of Agriculture. Part of the premises was occupied by the local school and part was reconstructed as flats for Latvian military veterans. Though still used as a school, Rundāle Palace was included in the list of state-protected monuments in 1924. In 1933, Rundāle Palace was taken over by the Ministry of Education and was officially reconstructed for use as a school.

The palace was dealt a serious blow after World War II, when a grain storehouse was set up in the premises in addition to the school. Later, the duke's dining room was transformed into the school's gymnasium. A school was located in the palace until 1978.

In 1963, Rundāle Palace became a branch of the Bauska local history museum. In 1965 and also in 1971, the Supreme Soviet of Latvian SSR decided to restore Rundāle Palace. In 1972, Rundāle Palace Museum was established. Latvian painter and art historian Imants Lancmanis became director of the new museum and restoration of the palace became his life's work. Extensive research and restoration work was completely funded by the state until 1992. After the restoration of Latvia's independence, the state continued to finance restoration work in part, with additional financing through private donations and later also through the Structural Funds and Cohesion Fund of the EU. In the spring of 2015, it was announced that restoration work in the Rundāle Palace was complete. Total restoration costs from 1972 until 2014 were estimated to be 8,420,495 euros.

The palace is one of the major tourist destinations in Latvia. It is also used for the accommodation of notable guests, such as the leaders of foreign nations. The palace and the surrounding gardens are now a museum.

== Gallery ==
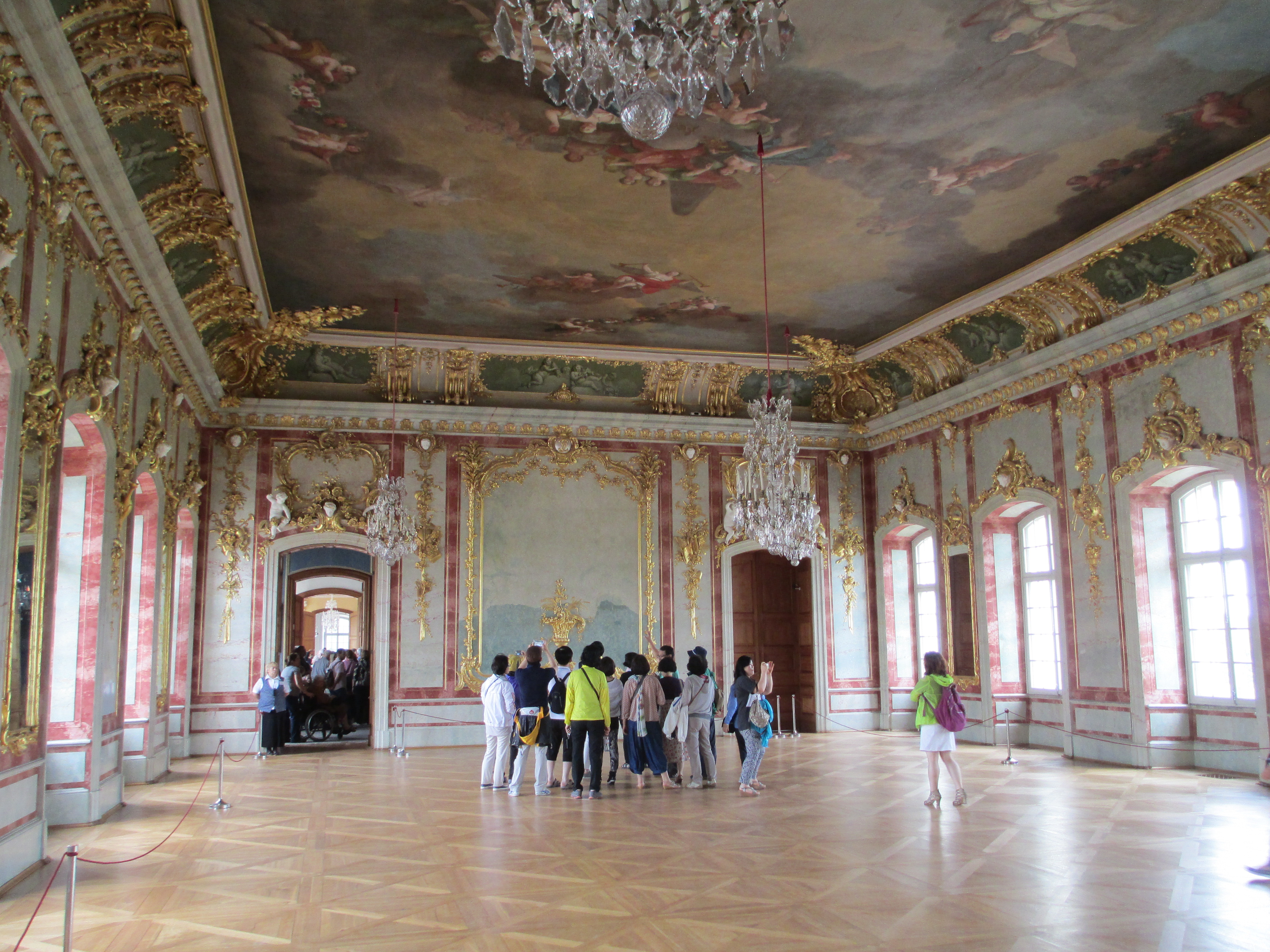
Throne room

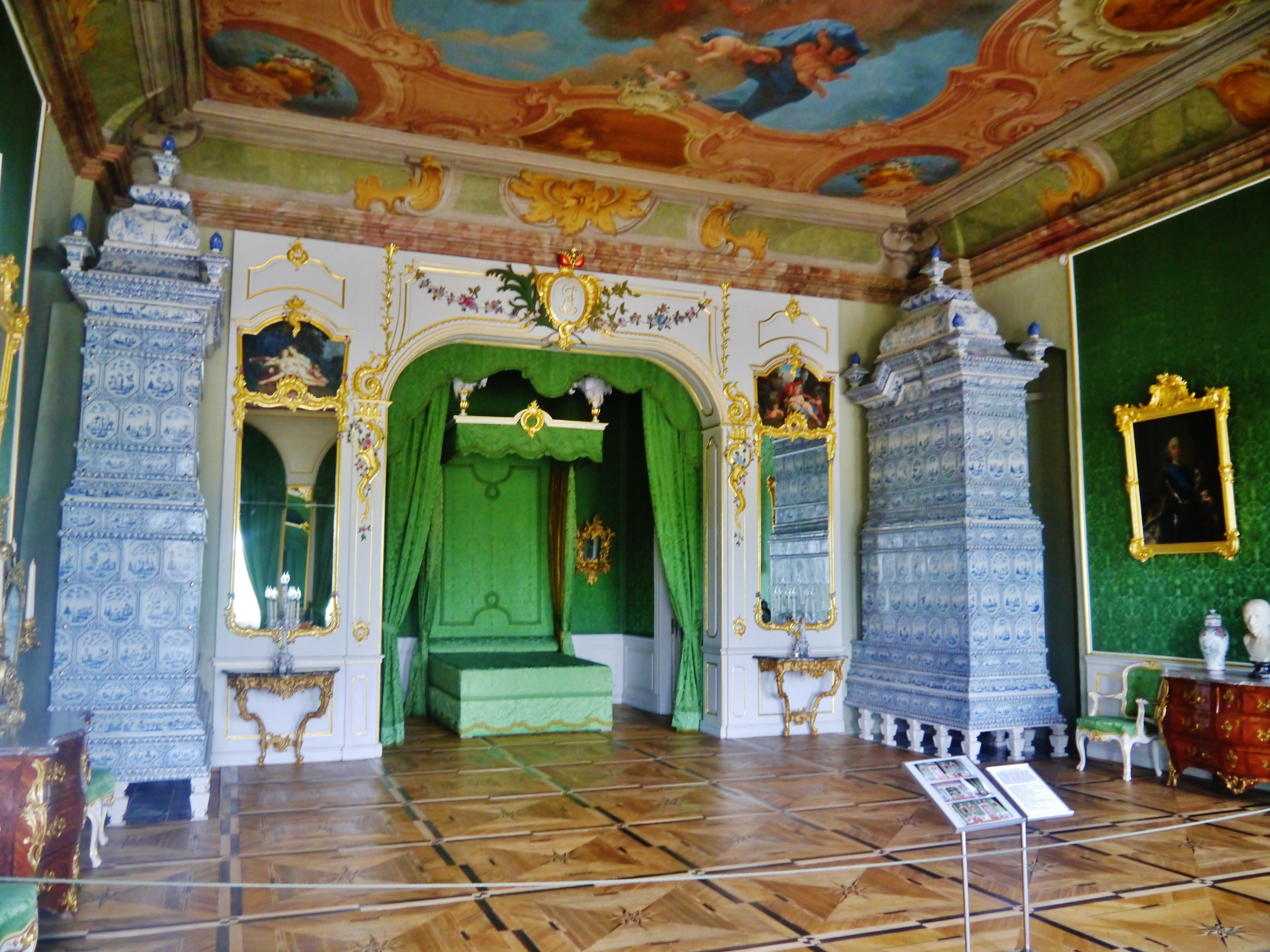
Duke's sleeping chambers

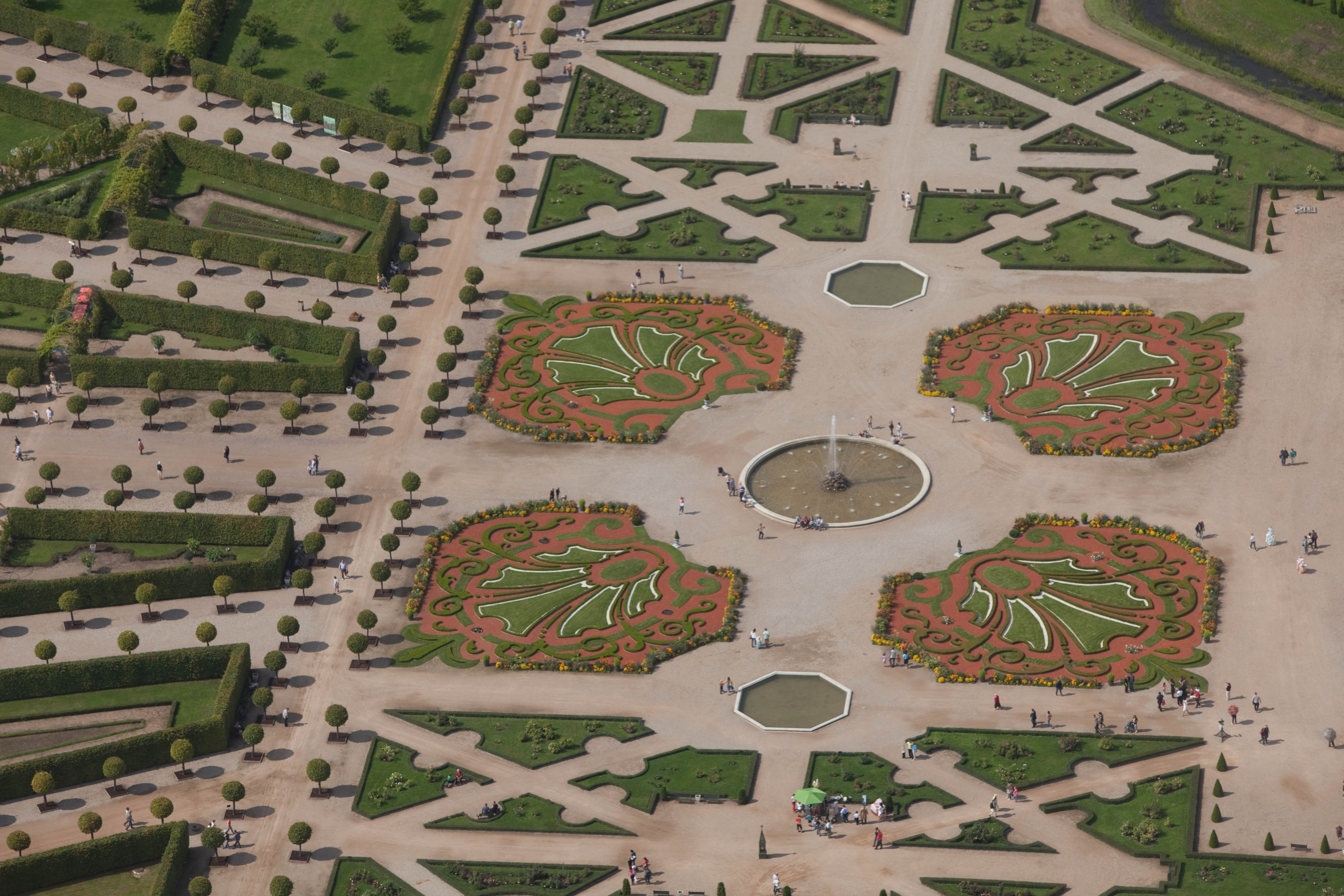
Aerial view of the gardens

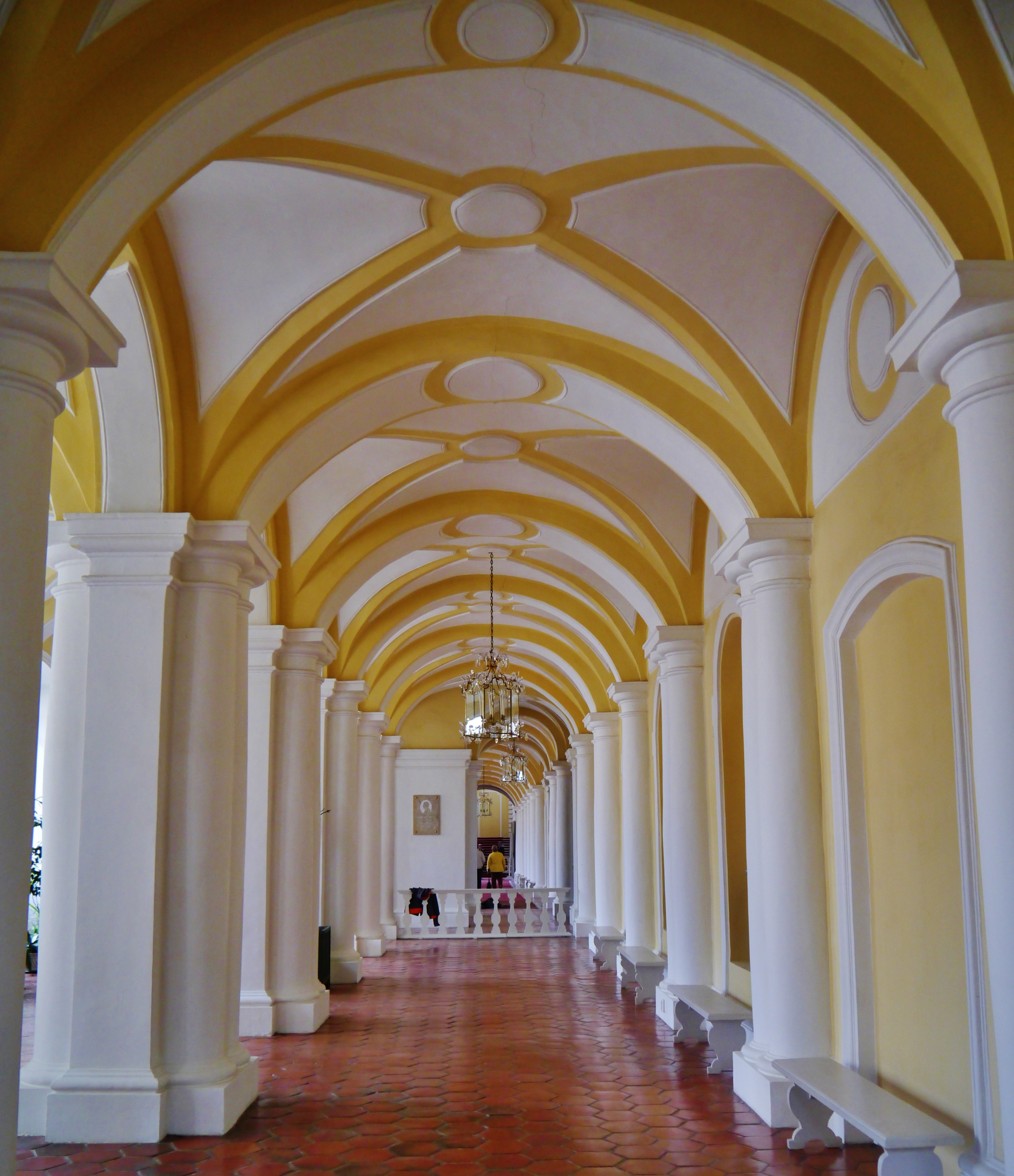
Vestibule

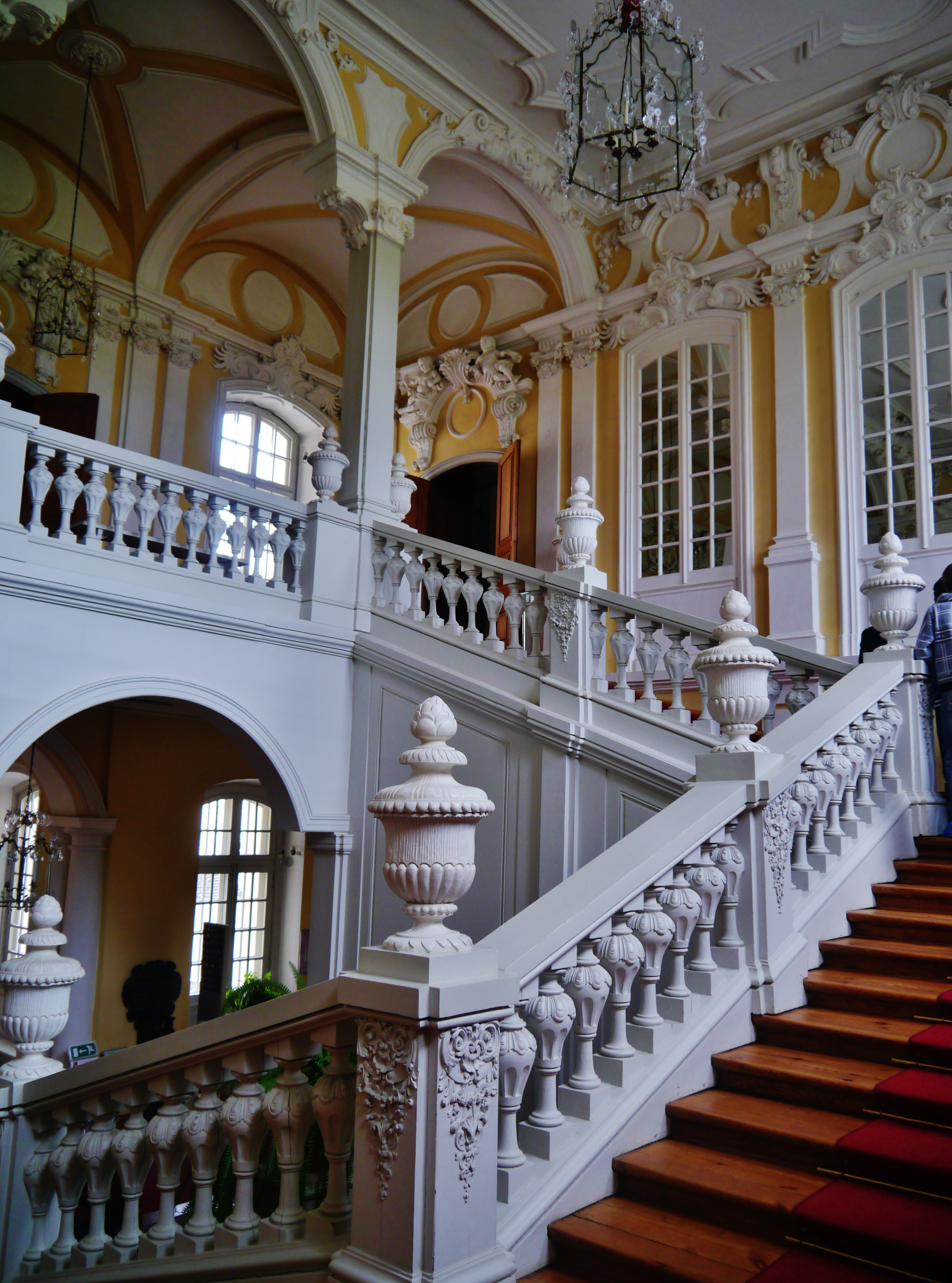
Staircase

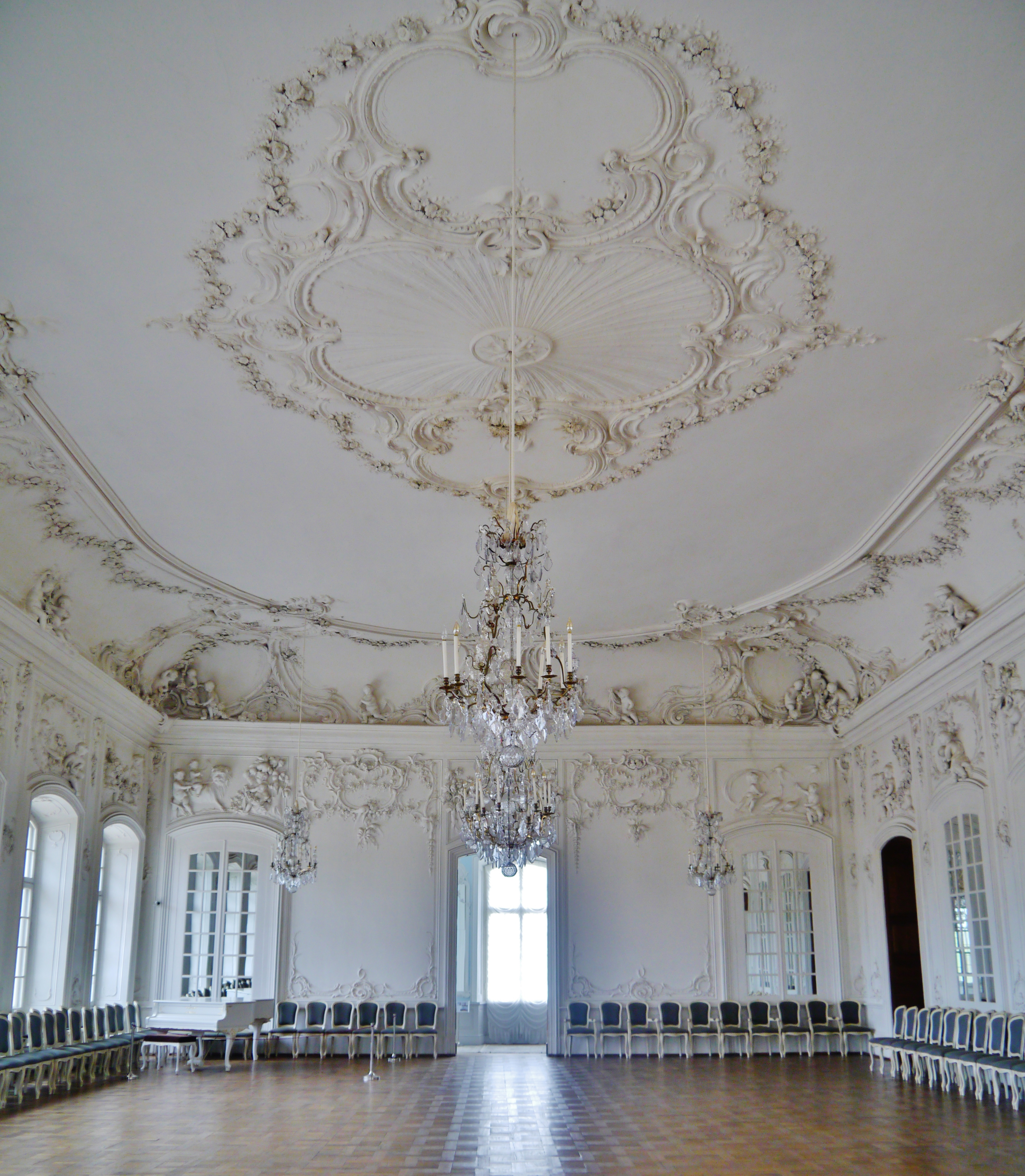
White hall (Ballroom)

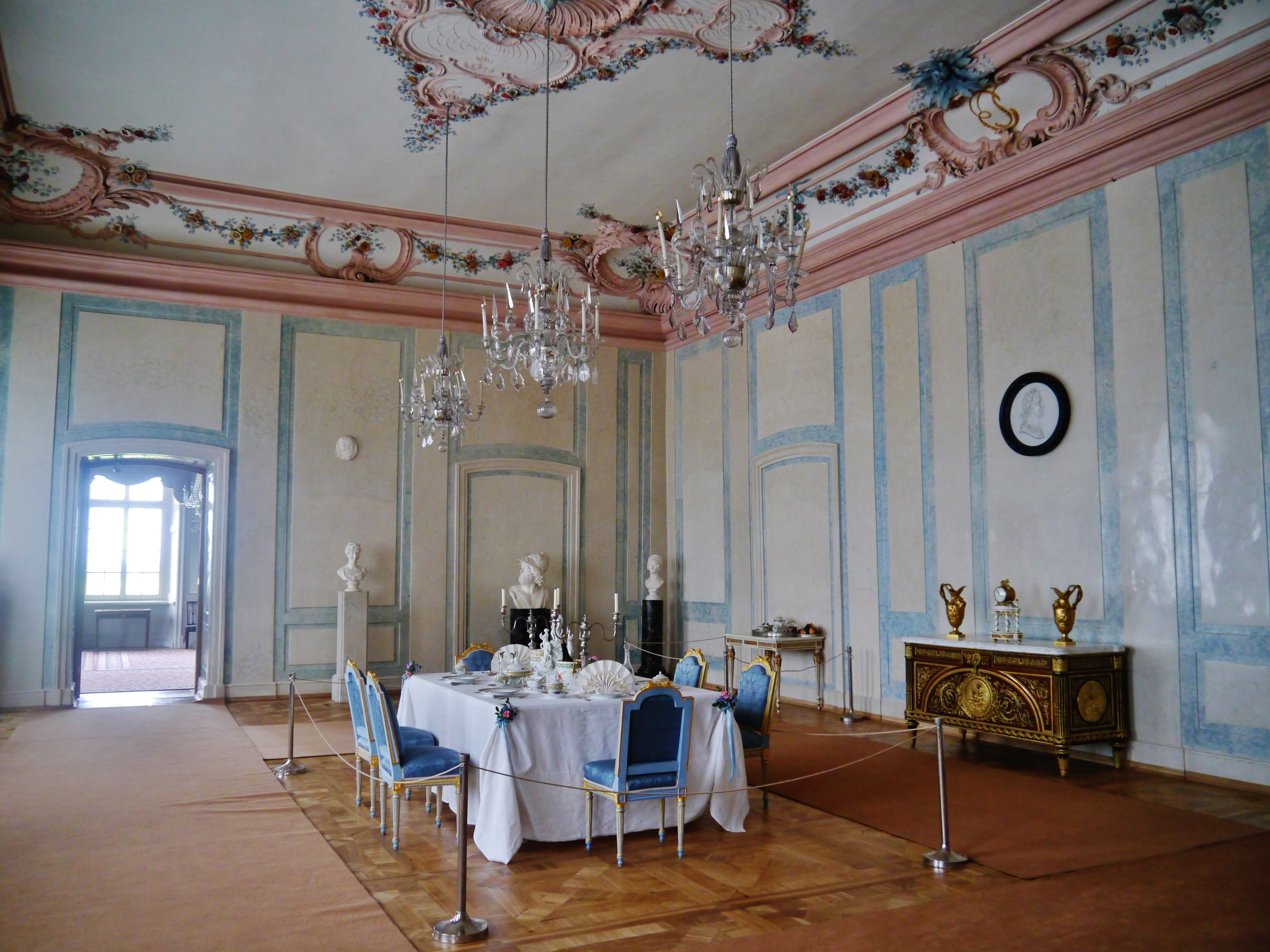
Dining hall

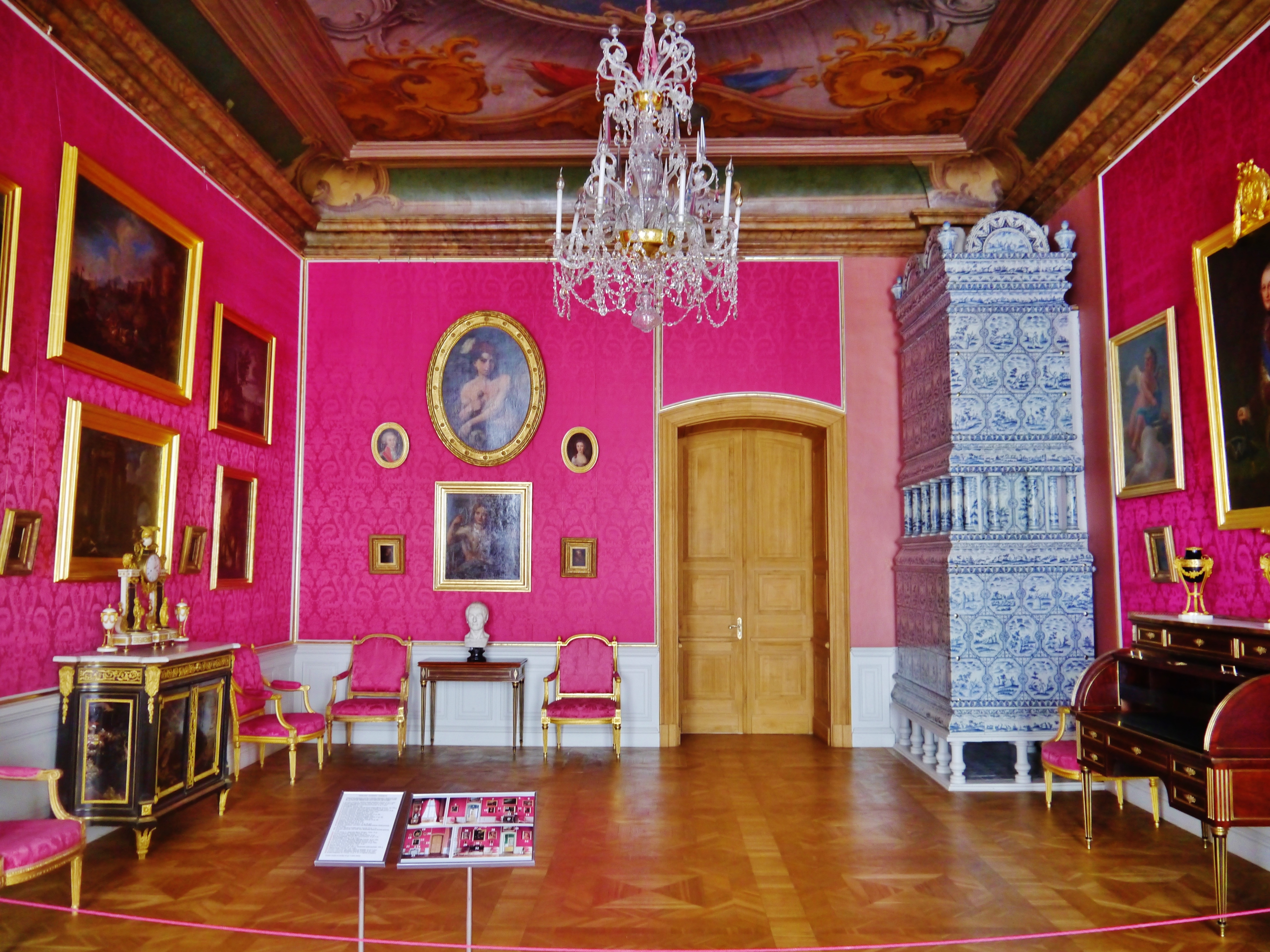
Dukes audience room

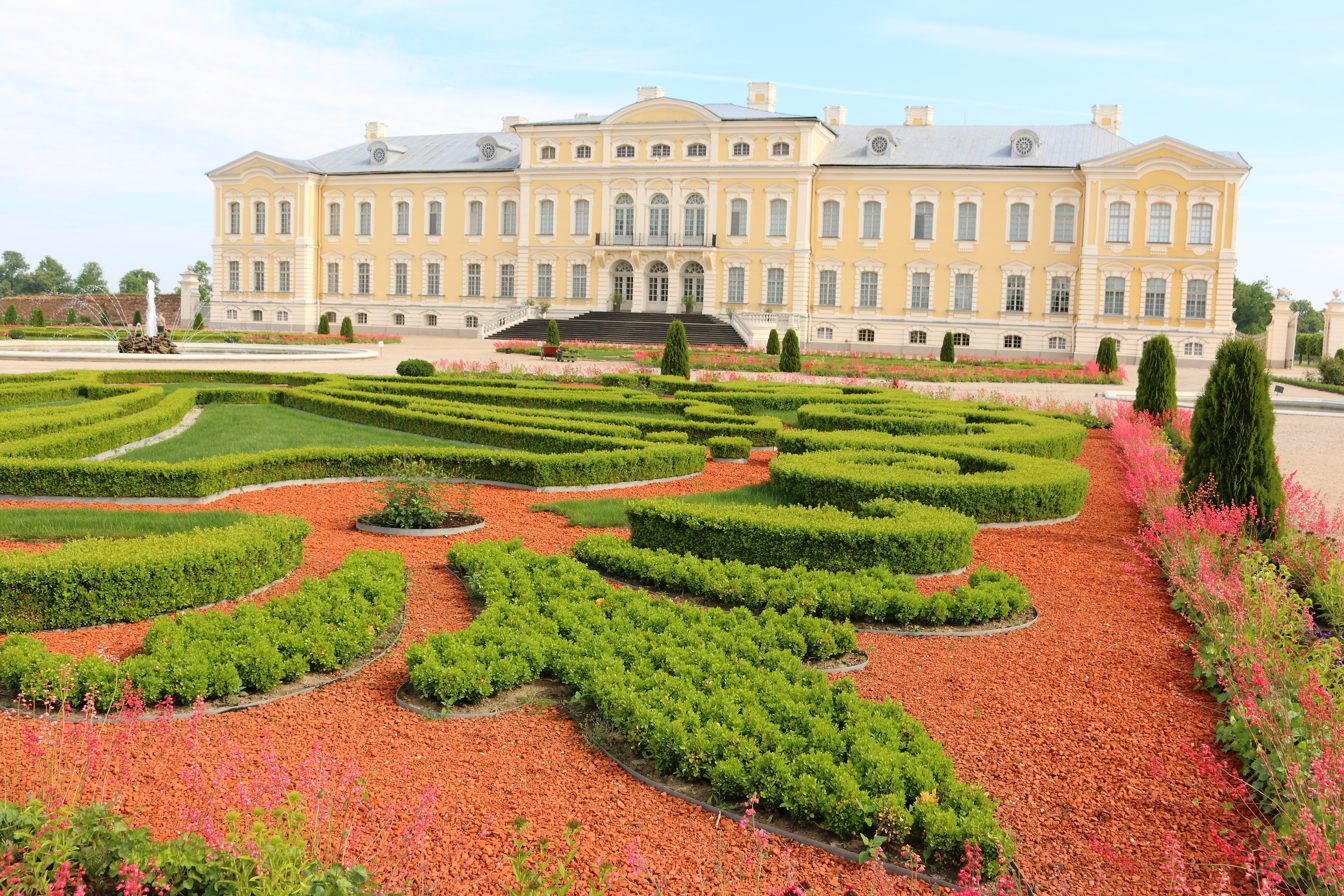
Palace view from the park

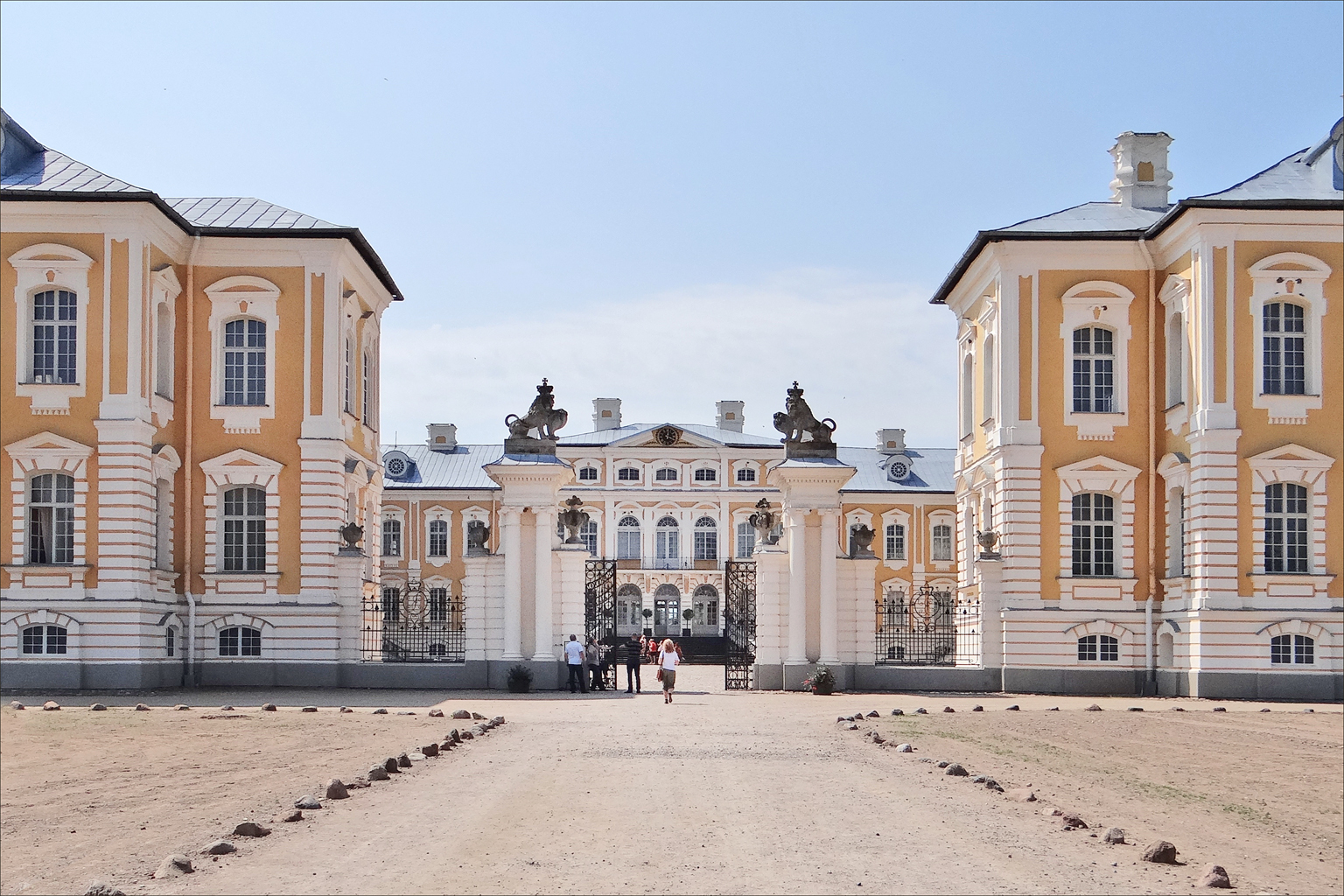
Palace entrance

== See also ==
- List of Baroque residences
- List of palaces and manor houses in Latvia
- Baltā māja
