= Alexander von Benckendorff (diplomat) =

Russian diplomat (1849–1917)

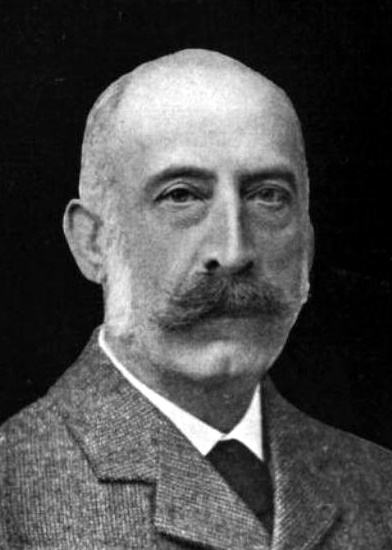
Count von Benckendorff

Count Alexander Philipp Konstantin Ludwig von Benckendorff (Russian: Александр Константинович Бенкендорф, romanized: Aleksandr Konstantinovich Benkendorf; 1 August 1849 – 11 January 1917) was a Russian diplomat, of Baltic German heritage, who served as ambassador to Denmark and the United Kingdom.

== Biography ==
He was born in 1849, the son of Count Konstantin Alexander Karl Wilhelm Maximilian von Benckendorff (Berlin, 22 October 1816 – Paris, 29 January 1858) and wife (Potsdam, 20 June 1848) Princess Louise Constantine Nathalie Johanne von Croÿ-Dülmen (Anholt, 2 November 1825 – Meran, 8 January 1890), grandson of General Konstantin von Benckendorff and grandnephew of General Count Alexander von Benckendorff. He was also a second cousin of Archduchess Isabella of Teschen through his maternal family.

Alexander Konstantinovich was educated in France and Germany before entering the diplomatic service in 1869. He began as an attaché in Florence, and eventually served in Rome. He resigned in 1876 and lived nearly ten years on his estates, in St. Petersburg and abroad. Returning to diplomacy in 1886, he became First Secretary at the Embassy in Vienna, and from 1897 to 1903 he was the Ambassador to Denmark. The Copenhagen post gave him a vantage point for watching the principal moving powers of European politics since the matrimonial alliances of the Danish royal family occasionally brought together in a friendly family circle the widow of Alexander III, Nicholas II and the Prince of Wales who was to become King Edward VII. In this way, Count von Benckendorff received his initiation into the spirit of an Anglo-Russian rapprochement even before it actually resulted in an entente.

From January 1903 until his death in 1917, he was the Ambassador to the Court of St. James's, the chief Russian diplomat in the United Kingdom. His major achievement was to organize the signing of the Anglo-Russian Entente in 1907, which solidified relations between the two countries and helped create the Triple Entente, which, unlike the Triple Alliance or the Franco-Russian Alliance itself, was not an alliance of mutual defense. This broad diplomatic alignment would later form the Allies of World War I. He also formally proposed the agenda for the Second Hague Conference of 1907.

== Death ==
Alexander von Benckendorff died on 11 January 1917 from influenza and was buried in Westminster Cathedral (the only lay person buried there), where he had worshipped weekly. Von Benckendorff was a convert to Roman Catholicism from Lutheranism.

== Family ==
Alexander married on 16 October 1879 in St. Petersburg Countess Sophie Shuvalova (St. Petersburg, 16 October 1857 – Ipswich, 28 May 1928), a granddaughter of Lev Naryshkin and Olga Potocka. They had three children:

- Count Constantine Alexandrovich (15 September 1880 – 25 September 1959), married in 1922 to Maria Korchinska, had issue.
- Count Peter Alexandrovich (19 January 1882 – 27 May 1915), married in 1909 to Elena Naryshkina, no issue.
- Countess Nathalie Louise Alexandrovna (20 May 1886 – 14 March 1968), married in 1911 to Sir Jasper Ridley, had issue.

Alexander's daughter Nathalie married Sir Jasper Ridley, and they had five children. Their son Jasper Maurice Alexander Ridley (London, 20 April 1913 – killed in Italy, 13 December 1943) married Helen Laura Cressida Bonham Carter (London, 22 April 1917 – Salisbury, 10 June 1998), a granddaughter of former British Prime Minister H. H. Asquith, 1st Earl of Oxford and Asquith. Jasper Maurice Alexander was also the father of economist Adam Ridley.

The eldest son Constantine married harpist Maria Korchinska. A younger son Peter was killed in one of the first battles of World War I on the East Prussian front.

== Honours and awards ==
=== Russian ===
- Order of St. Alexander Nevsky with diamonds "for ex-zealous service."
- Order of the White Eagle
- Order of St. Vladimir, 2nd and 3rd classes
- Order of St. Anna, 1st degree
- Order of St. Stanislaus, 1st degree

=== Foreign ===
- United Kingdom: Honorary Grand Cross of the Royal Victorian Order, 18 November 1907

== Ancestry ==
Ancestors of Alexander von Benckendorff (diplomat)

8. Christoph Ivanovich von Benckendorff
4. Konstantin Christoforovich von Benkendorff
9. Baroness Anna Juliane Schilling von Cannstatt
2. Count Konstantin Alexander von Benckendorff
10. Count Maximilian von Alopaeus
5. Natalia von Alopaeus
11. Friederike Wilhelmine von Quast
1. Count Alexander Konstantinovich von Benckendorff
12. Auguste, 9th Duke of Croÿ
6. Prince Philippe von Croÿ-Dülmen
13. Anne-Victurnienne-Henriette de Rochechouart de Mortemart
3. Princess Louise Johanne von Croÿ-Dülmen
14. Konstantin, 3rd Prince of Salm-Salm
7. Princess Johanna Wilhelmine Auguste of Salm-Salm
15. Countess Maria Walburga von Sternberg-Manderscheid
