= List of ambassadors of Russia to the United Kingdom =

Ambassador of the Russian Federation to the United Kingdom
- Ambassador of Russia to the Court of Saint James's
- Emblem of the Russian Foreign Ministry
- Incumbent; Vacant since 21 July 2026
- Ministry of Foreign Affairs; Embassy of Russia, London
- Style: His Excellency; The Honourable
- Reports to: Minister of Foreign Affairs
- Residence: Harrington House
- Seat: London
- Appointer: President of Russia
- Term length: No fixed term
- Formation: 1556
- First holder: Osip Nepeya as ambassador to the Kingdom of England
- Website: Embassy of Russia in London

The ambassador extraordinary and plenipotentiary of the Russian Federation to the United Kingdom of Great Britain and Northern Ireland, or formally the ambassador of the Russian Federation to the Court of St James's, is the official representative of the president and the government of the Russian Federation to the monarch and the government of the United Kingdom.

The ambassador and his staff work at large in the Russian Embassy in London, while the official residence of the ambassador is 13 Kensington Palace Gardens. There is a consulate general in Edinburgh.

The post of ambassador to the United Kingdom is currently vacant, after the previous incumbent was withdrawn on 21 July 2026.

== History of diplomatic relations ==
- 1553: Beginning of diplomatic relations.
- 1706: Establishment of the permanent mission in the Kingdom of England.
- 14 November 1720: Relations freezes as Great Britain (England's successor) refuse to recognize Russia as the empire.
- 1730: Restoration of diplomatic relations.
- 1741–1748: Allies in the Austrian War of Succession.
- 1756–1763: Opponents in the Seven Years' War.
- 22 November 1800: Emperor Paul imposed sanctions on Great Britain, diplomatic relations interrupted.
- 24 March 1801: The new Emperor Alexander cancels the sanctions on the request of British monarch George III, relations restored.
- 25 March 1802: Amiens peace treaty signed.
- 1803–1805: Allies in the coalition against France.

The United Kingdom established diplomatic relations with the Soviet Union in 1924. However, King George V was still upset over the execution of the Romanov family and refused to receive the Soviet ambassador. In a breach of diplomatic protocol, he dispatched the Prince of Wales to accept the Soviet ambassador's credentials.

== List of representatives (1556–present) ==
=== Tsardom of Russia to the Kingdom of England (1556–1707) ===
Name	Title	Appointment	Termination	Notes
Osip Nepeya	Chief of embassy	1556	1557	
Fyodor Pisemsky	Chief of embassy	1582	1583	
Grigory Mikulin	Chief of embassy	1600	1601	
Aleksey Zyuzin	Chief of embassy	1613	1613	
Pyotr Prozorovsky	Chief of embassy	1662	1662	

=== Tsardom of Russia to the Kingdom of Great Britain (1707–1720) ===
Name	Title	Appointment	Termination	Notes
Andrey Matveyev	Chief of mission	May 1707	1708	
Boris Kurakin	Minister Plenipotentiary	1710	1711	
Albrecht von der Liet	Resident	1711	1713	
Bertram von Shak	Resident	1713	1717	
Fyodor Veselovsky	Resident	9 June 1717	February 1720	
Mikhail Bestuzhev-Ryumin	Resident	March 1720	14 November 1720	
Great Northern War: Diplomatic relations interrupted (1720–1730)

=== Russian Empire to the Kingdom of Great Britain (1731–1801) ===
Name	Title	Appointment	Termination	Notes
Antiokh Kantemir	Resident (before 17 July 1733); Envoy (after 17 July 1733)	24 December 1731	April 1738	
Sergey Dolgorukov	Envoy	1738	1739	
Ivan Shcherbatov	Envoy	June 1739	March 1742	
Semyon Naryshkin	Envoy	31 December 1741	June 1743	
Ivan Shcherbatov	Envoy	20 June 1743	August 1746	
Pyotr Chernyshyov	Envoy	14 July 1746	20 March 1755	
Aleksandr Golitsyn	Envoy	1755	1762	
Alexander Vorontsov	Envoy	February 1762	1764	
Heinrich Gross	Envoy	9 December 1763	1765	
Fyodor Gross	Chargé d'affaires	1765	1766	
Aleksey Musin-Pushkin	Envoy	December 1765	July 1768	
Ivan Chernyshev	Envoy	1768	August 1769	
Aleksey Musin-Pushkin	Envoy	12 August 1769	5 May 1779	
Ivan Lizakevich	Chargé d'affaires	1775	1777	
Ivan Lizakevich	Chargé d'affaires	1778	1778	
Ivan Simolin	Envoy	5 May 1779	14 March 1784	
Semyon Vorontsov	Envoy	24 May 1784	4 May 1800	
Ivan Lizakevich	Chargé d'affaires	1785	1785	
Ivan Lizakevich	Chargé d'affaires	4 May 1800	September 1800	
Malta Question: Diplomatic relations by chargé d'affaires (1800–1801)
Yakov Smirnov	Chargé d'affaires	29 September 1800	25 May 1801	

=== Russian Empire to the United Kingdom of Great Britain and Ireland (1801–1917) ===
Name	Title	Appointment	Termination	Notes
Semyon Vorontsov	Ambassador	25 May 1801	15 May 1806	
Pavel Stroganov	Chargé d'affaires	10 May 1806	7 December 1806	
Maxim Alopeus	Special envoy	7 December 1806	2 February 1808	
Anglo-Russian War: Diplomatic relations suspended (1808–1812)
Pavel Sukhtelen	Special envoy	30 August 1812	30 September 1812	
Pavel Nikolai	Chargé d'affaires	30 August 1812	18 September 1812	
Khristofor Liven	Ambassador	18 September 1812	22 May 1834	
Adam Matushevich	Minister Plenipotentiary	7 July 1830	23 October 1830	
Pavel Medem	Chargé d'affaires	20 June 1834	31 January 1835	
Carlo Pozzo di Borgo	Ambassador	5 January 1835	26 December 1839	
Nikolai Kiselyov	Chargé d'affaires	1839	1840	
Phillip Brunnov	Envoy	17 June 1840	18 December 1854	
Crimean War: Diplomatic relations suspended (1854–1856)
Mikhail Khreptovich	Envoy	30 June 1856	8 February 1858	
Phillip Brunnov	Envoy (before 4 December 1860); Ambassador (after 4 December 1860)	8 February 1858	21 May 1870	
Nikolay Orlov	Ambassador appointee	21 May 1870	28 November 1870	Was not accredited
Phillip Brunnov	Ambassador	28 November 1870	22 July 1874	
Pyotr Shuvalov	Ambassador	22 July 1874	19 October 1879	
Aleksei Lobanov-Rostovskii	Ambassador	22 December 1879	13 July 1882	
Aleksandr Davydov	Chargé d'affaires	1882	1882	
Arthur von Mohrenheim	Ambassador	13 July 1882	8 February 1884	
Yegor Staal	Ambassador	27 March 1884	30 August 1902	
Alexander von Benckendorff	Ambassador	1902	11 January 1917	
Konstantin Nabokov	Chargé d'affaires	1917	1917	
Sergey Sazonov	Ambassador	January 1917	3 March 1917	
Yevgeny Sablin	Chargé d'affaires	1919	1924	Unaccredited by the post-Imperial Russian government

=== Russian Soviet Federative Socialist Republic to the United Kingdom of Great Britain and Ireland (1918–1923) ===
Name	Title	Appointment	Termination	Notes
Maxim Litvinov	Authorised representative Plenipotentiary (after June 1918)	January 1918	September 1918	Not accredited
Leonid Krasin	Plenipotentiary	1920	July 1923	Not accredited

=== Union of Soviet Socialist Republics to the United Kingdom of Great Britain and Northern Ireland (1923–1991) ===
Name	Title	Appointment	Termination	Notes
Christian Rakovsky	Plenipotentiary	July 1923	30 October 1925	Accredited from 1 February 1924
Leonid Krasin	Plenipotentiary	30 October 1925	24 November 1926	
Arkady Rosengolts	Plenipotentiary	1926	26 May 1927	
Grigori Sokolnikov	Plenipotentiary	November 1929	14 September 1932	
Ivan Maisky	Plenipotentiary (before 9 May 1941); Ambassador (after 9 May 1941)	8 November 1932	12 August 1943	
Fedor Gusev	Ambassador	12 August 1943	22 August 1946	
Georgy Zarubin	Ambassador	28 September 1946	13 June 1952	
Andrei Gromyko	Ambassador	13 June 1952	May 1953	
Yakov Malik	Ambassador	May 1953	11 January 1960	
Aleksandr Soldatov	Ambassador	11 January 1960	25 January 1966	
Mikhail Smirnovsky	Ambassador	25 January 1966	27 April 1973	
Nikolai Lunkov	Ambassador	27 April 1973	5 November 1980	
Viktor Popov	Ambassador	20 November 1980	10 April 1986	
Leonid Zamyatin	Ambassador	10 April 1986	18 November 1991	
Boris Pankin	Ambassador	19 November 1991	25 December 1991	

=== Russian Federation to the United Kingdom (1991–present) ===
Name	Title	Appointment	Termination	Notes
Boris Pankin	Ambassador	25 December 1991	16 September 1993	
Anatoly Adamishin	Ambassador	5 September 1994	6 June 1997	
Yury Fokin	Ambassador	6 June 1997	20 January 2000	
Grigory Karasin	Ambassador	6 March 2000	9 June 2005	
Yuri Fedotov	Ambassador	9 June 2005	27 August 2010	
Alexander Yakovenko	Ambassador	24 January 2011	26 August 2019	
Andrey Kelin	Ambassador	5 November 2019	22 August 2026	

== See also ==
- List of ambassadors of the United Kingdom to Russia
