= Konstantin von Benckendorff =

Russian general and diplomat (1785–1828)

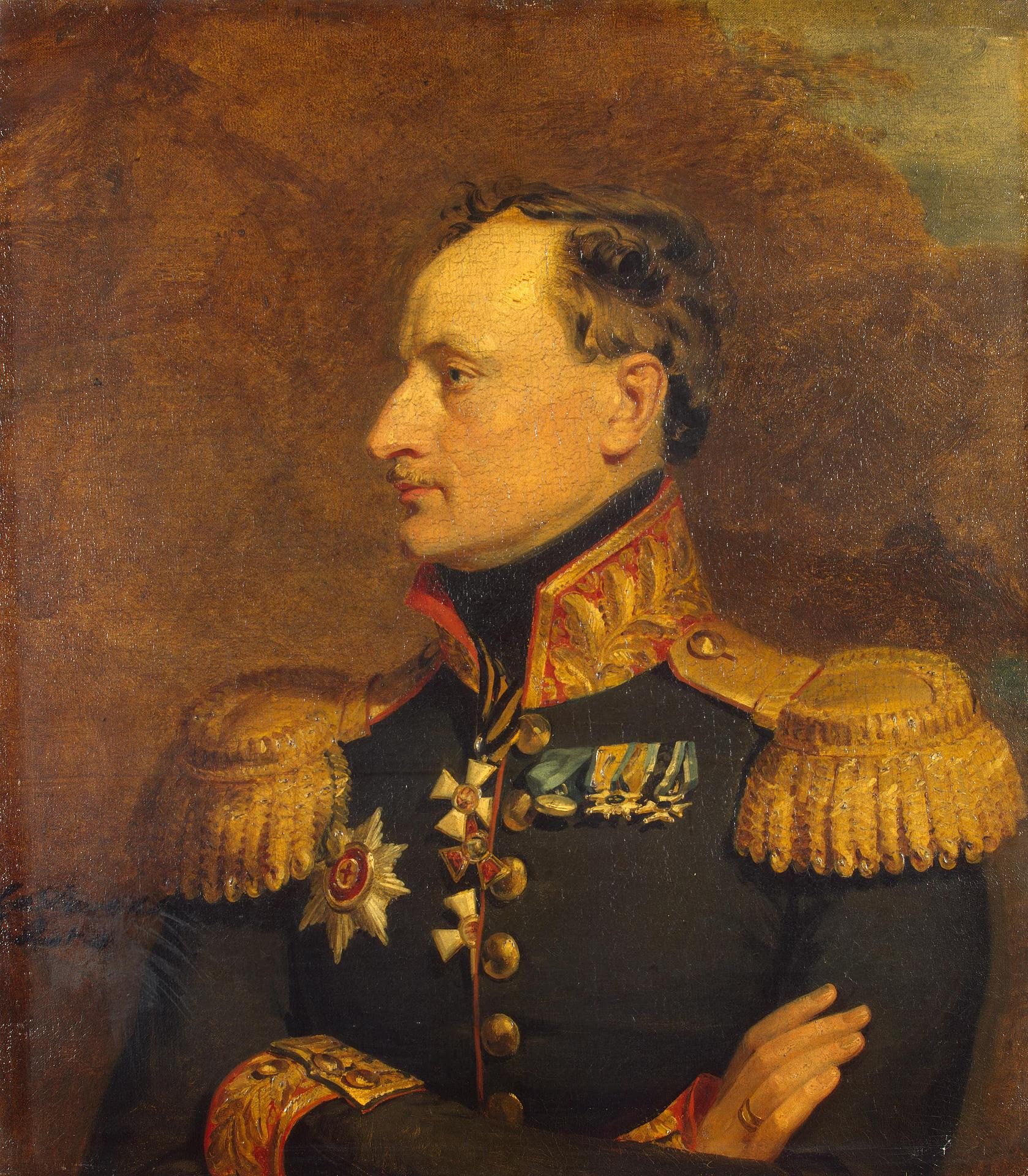
Portrait by George Dawe from the Military Gallery, 1823–1826

Konstantin von Benckendorff (Russian: Константин Христофорович Бенкендорф, romanized: Konstantin Khristoforovich Benkendorf; 31 January 1785 – 6 August 1828) was a Russian general and diplomat of Baltic German descent.

== Life and career ==
Konstantin von Benckendorff was born into Russia's distinctive Baltic nobility to a Baltic German family in Saint Petersburg, son of General Baron Christoph von Benckendorff (Fredrikshamn, 12 January 1749 – Kolga, 10 June 1823), who served as the military governor of Livonia, and wife Baroness Anna Juliane Charlotte Schilling von Canstatt (Thalheim, 31 July 1744 – Riga, 11 March 1797), who held a high position at the Romanov Court as senior lady-in-waiting and best friend of Empress Maria Fyodorovna, and paternal grandson of Johann Michael von Benckendorff and wife Sophie von Löwenstern.

His brother Alexander von Benckendorff (1783–1844) was also a general and statesman, and his sister Dorothea von Lieven was a political force famous at London, St. Petersburg, and Paris. His other sister Maria von Benckendorff (14 February 1784 – 16 November 1841) married Ivan Georgievich Sevitsch.

Trained as a diplomat, he joined the army to take part in the concluding stages of the Napoleonic Wars, specifically in the taking of Kassel, Fulda, Hanau, Reims, and Soissons. After the war, Benckendorff returned to diplomacy.

Five years later, he was appointed Minister Plenipotentiary to Baden and Stuttgart. With the outbreak of the Russo-Persian War he returned to Russia, captured Echmiadzin and routed the Kurds near Erivan. He then crossed the Araks River and defeated the Persian cavalry. Benckendorff died of a fever that swept through the Russian army at the beginning of the Russo-Turkish War, 1828–1829.

== Personal life ==
Konstantin married on 1 September 1814 Natalia von Alopaeus (Berlin, 4 February 1796 – Stuttgart, 29 January 1823), daughter of Count Maximilian Magnus von Alopaeus and his wife, Friederike Wilhelmine Henriette Antoinette von Quast. They couple had two children:

- Count Konstantin Alexander von Benckendorff (Berlin, 22 October 1816 – Paris, 29 January 1858); married in Potsdam on 20 June 1848 to Princess Louise Constantine Nathalie Johanne von Croÿ-Dülmen (2 November 1825 – 8 January 1890)
- Countess Marie von Benckendorff (Stuttgart, 22 November 1818 – St. Petersburg, 31 October 1844); married to Prince Pavel Matveyevich Golenischev-Kutuzov-Tolstoy (20 November 1800 – 27 February 1883).

== Honours and awards ==
- Order of St. Anna
  - 2nd class, with diamonds - 1812
  - 1st class - 17 April 1823
  - Diamonds added to 1st class - 16 February 1824
- Order of St. George
  - 4th class - 8 February 1813
  - 3rd class - 10 September 1815
- Order of St. Vladimir
  - 4th class - 25 January 1812
  - 3rd class - 18 September 1813
  - 2nd class - 22 July 1827
- Order of the Red Eagle, 2nd class (Prussia)
- Knight First Class of the Order of the Sword (Sweden)
- Knight of the Military Order of Max Joseph (Bavaria)
- Imperial Order of Leopold (Austria)
- Golden Sword with the inscription "For Bravery", with diamonds, twice (1814 and 1 January 1828)
- Silver medal "In memory of the War of 1812"

== Source ==
- "Бенкендорф, Александр Христофорович" . Brockhaus and Efron Encyclopedic Dictionary (in Russian). 1906.
