= Grinevsky =

Grinevsky (feminine: Grinevskaya) is a Russian-language surname transliterated from the Polish surname Hryniewski

- Alexandr Grinevsky, birth name of Alexander Grin, Russian writer
- Oleg Grinevsky (1930–2019), Russian diplomat
- Isabella Grinevskaya (1864–1944), Russian-Jewish writer
