= Yuri Fedotov =

Russian diplomat (1947–2022)

Yury Fedotov
- Юрий Федотов
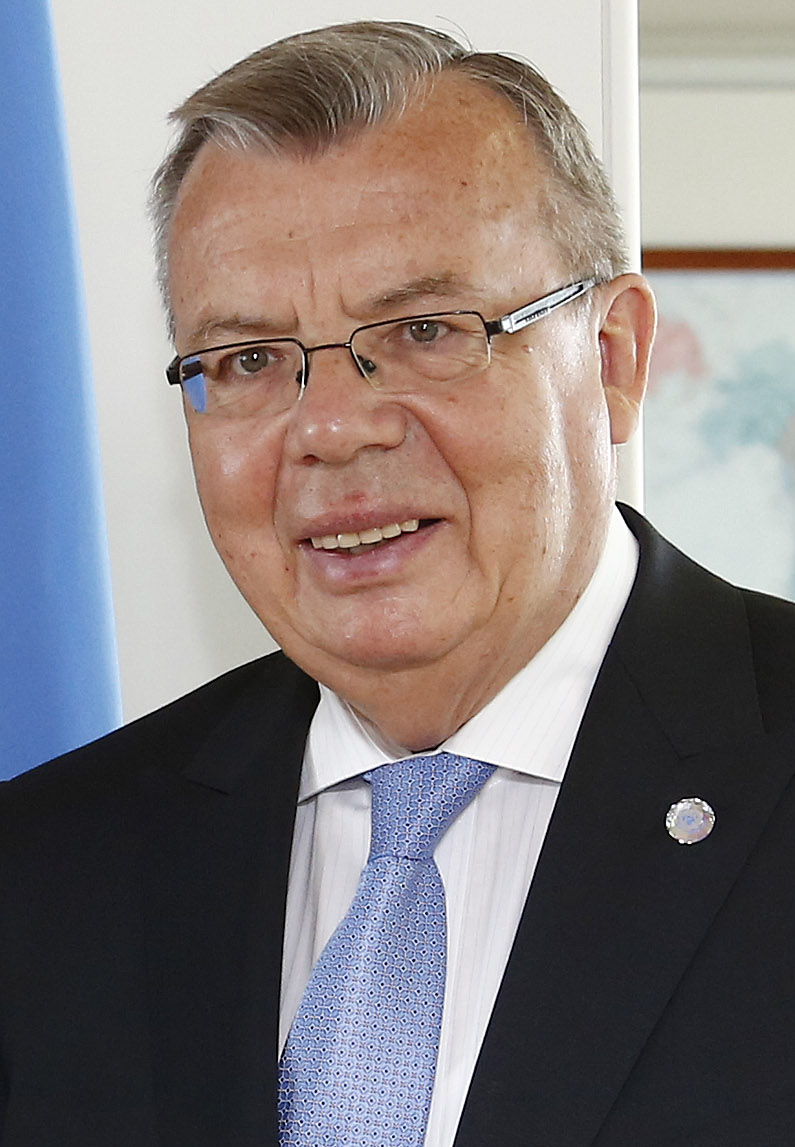
- Fedotov in 2014

Executive Director of the United Nations Office on Drugs and Crime
- In office 9 July 2010 – 31 December 2019
- Succeeded by: Ghada Waly

Ambassador of Russia to the United Kingdom
- In office 9 June 2005 – 27 August 2010
- Preceded by: Grigory Karasin
- Succeeded by: Alexander Yakovenko

Personal details
- Born: Yury Viktorovich Fedotov; 14 December 1947 Sukhumi, Georgian SSR, Soviet Union
- Died: 16 June 2022 (aged 74) Austria
- Education: Moscow State Institute of International Relations
- Awards: Honored Employee of the Diplomatic Service of the Russian Federation;

Yury Viktorovich Fedotov (Russian: Юрий Викторович Федотов, 14 December 1947 – 16 June 2022) was a Russian diplomat. From 2010 to 2019 he served as executive director of the United Nations Office on Drugs and Crime (UNODC) and director-general of the United Nations Office at Vienna (UNOV) with the rank of Under-Secretary-General, after having previously served as the Ambassador of Russia to the United Kingdom.

Fedotov graduated from the Moscow State Institute of International Relations in 1971. He has held many foreign service positions to the UN and worked at Soviet embassies in Algeria and India.

In 2002 he became the Russian Federation's Deputy Minister for Foreign Affairs and held this post until 2005. From 2005 until 2010 he was Ambassador of Russia to the Court of St. James's.

Fedotov died in Austria on 16 June 2022, at the age of 74.

== Career ==
Yury Fedotov was the executive director of the United Nations Office on Drugs and Crime (UNODC) at the rank of under-secretary-general, until 31 December 2019. He was appointed to this position by UN Secretary-General Ban Ki-moon on 9 July 2010. He was also director-general of the UN Office at Vienna (UNOV). Prior to this appointment, Fedotov participated in many discussions among the main deliberative bodies of the UN in New York City. He served as a member of the College of Commissioners of the former United Nations Monitoring, Verification and Inspection Commission (UNMOVIC) in Iraq.

Positions in intergovernmental organisations
Preceded by (Italy) Antonio Maria Costa	Executive Director of the United Nations Office on Drugs and Crime; 2010-2019	Succeeded by (Egypt) Ghada Waly
