= Andrey Kelin =

Russian diplomat

- Андрей Келин

Senator of the Russian Federation from Mordovia
- Incumbent
- Assumed office 25 September 2026
- Preceded by: Sergey Kislyak

Ambassador of Russia to the United Kingdom
- In office 5 November 2019 – 21 July 2026
- President: Vladimir Putin
- Preceded by: Alexander Yakovenko
- Succeeded by: Vacant

Permanent Representative of Russia to the Organization for Security and Co-operation in Europe
- In office 7 June 2011 – 5 August 2015
- Preceded by: Anvar Azimov
- Succeeded by: Aleksandr Lukashevich

Personal details
- Born: Andrey Vladimirovich Kelin; 15 May 1957 (age 69)
- Spouse: Irina Kelina
- Children: 2
- Education: Moscow State Institute of International Relations
- Awards: Order of Honour; Order of Friendship; Medal of the Order "For Merit to the Fatherland" Second Class

Andrey Vladimirovich Kelin (Russian: Андрей Владимирович Келин; born 15 May 1957) is a Russian diplomat. He has served in various diplomatic roles since the 1970s, and served as Ambassador of Russia to the United Kingdom from 2019 to 2026.

Born in 1957, Kelin embarked on a diplomatic career, joining the Ministry of Foreign Affairs in 1979 in the Soviet Union. He has held various posts in embassies in Europe, and took part in arms-limitation talks and then in the ministry's department of Pan-European Cooperation. After a period as Deputy Permanent Representative of the Russian Federation to NATO and then representative to the Organization for Security and Co-operation in Europe, Kelin eventually rose to be in charge of the Department of Pan-European Cooperation in 2015. In 2019, he was appointed Ambassador of Russia to the United Kingdom.

== Early life and career ==
Born on 15 May 1957, Kelin studied at the Faculty of International Journalism at Moscow State Institute of International Relations, and joined the Ministry of Foreign Affairs in 1979. His early work was in various positions in the ministry, and in overseas embassies, including the Netherlands, Switzerland, and Belgium. He speaks Russian, English, French and Dutch.

Kelin's first overseas posting was to the Soviet embassy in the Netherlands, from 1979 until 1983. He was part of the Soviet delegation to the Geneva talks in the early 1980s, ultimately resulting in the Intermediate-Range Nuclear Forces Treaty in 1987. He had a second overseas posting between 1990 and 1995 at the Soviet, and later Russian, embassy in Belgium. Between 1995 and 1998, Kelin served as a head of department at the Department of Pan-European Cooperation in the Ministry of Foreign Affairs, and then from 1998 to 2003 he was Deputy Permanent Representative of the Russian Federation to NATO. The permanent representative at this time was Sergey Kislyak.

== Permanent representative and ambassadorship ==
In 2003, Kelin became Deputy Director of the Department of Pan-European Cooperation, and then from September 2005 served as Director of the Fourth Department of the Commonwealth of Independent States countries. He was part of the Russian delegation to the Geneva International Discussions on Security and Stability in the Transcaucasus. On 7 June 2011, he took up the post of Permanent Representative of the Russian Federation to the Organization for Security and Co-operation in Europe, succeeding Anvar Azimov. Part of his brief was the continuing discussions on peaceful settlements in the Transcaucasian region. He was recalled on 5 August 2015, and on 21 September 2015 he was appointed Director of the Department of Pan-European Cooperation. On 5 November 2019, Kelin was appointed Ambassador of Russia to the United Kingdom. He succeeded Alexander Yakovenko, who had been recalled in August.

Following the 2022 Russian invasion, on 20 June 2022, Kelin received a ban on entering the Westminster Parliamentary Estate alongside all other Russian diplomats in the UK.

In June 2025, Kelin denied that Russian casualties in the war in Ukraine had reached one million, but refused to give actual losses. He told CNN that there were about 600,000 Russian troops in Ukraine, down from 700,000 in June 2024, and that 50–60,000 new troops were being recruited and sent to Ukraine every month, which would suggest that Russia had lost about 250,000 troops since January 2025.

== Rank and awards ==
Kelin holds the diplomatic rank of Ambassador Extraordinary and Plenipotentiary, to which he was appointed on 14 November 2012. Over his career he has been awarded the Order of Honour on 24 October 2017, the Order of Friendship on 18 August 2009, and the Medal of the Order "For Merit to the Fatherland" Second Class in 1998.
