= Alexander Yakovenko (diplomat) =

Russian diplomat

- Александр Яковенко
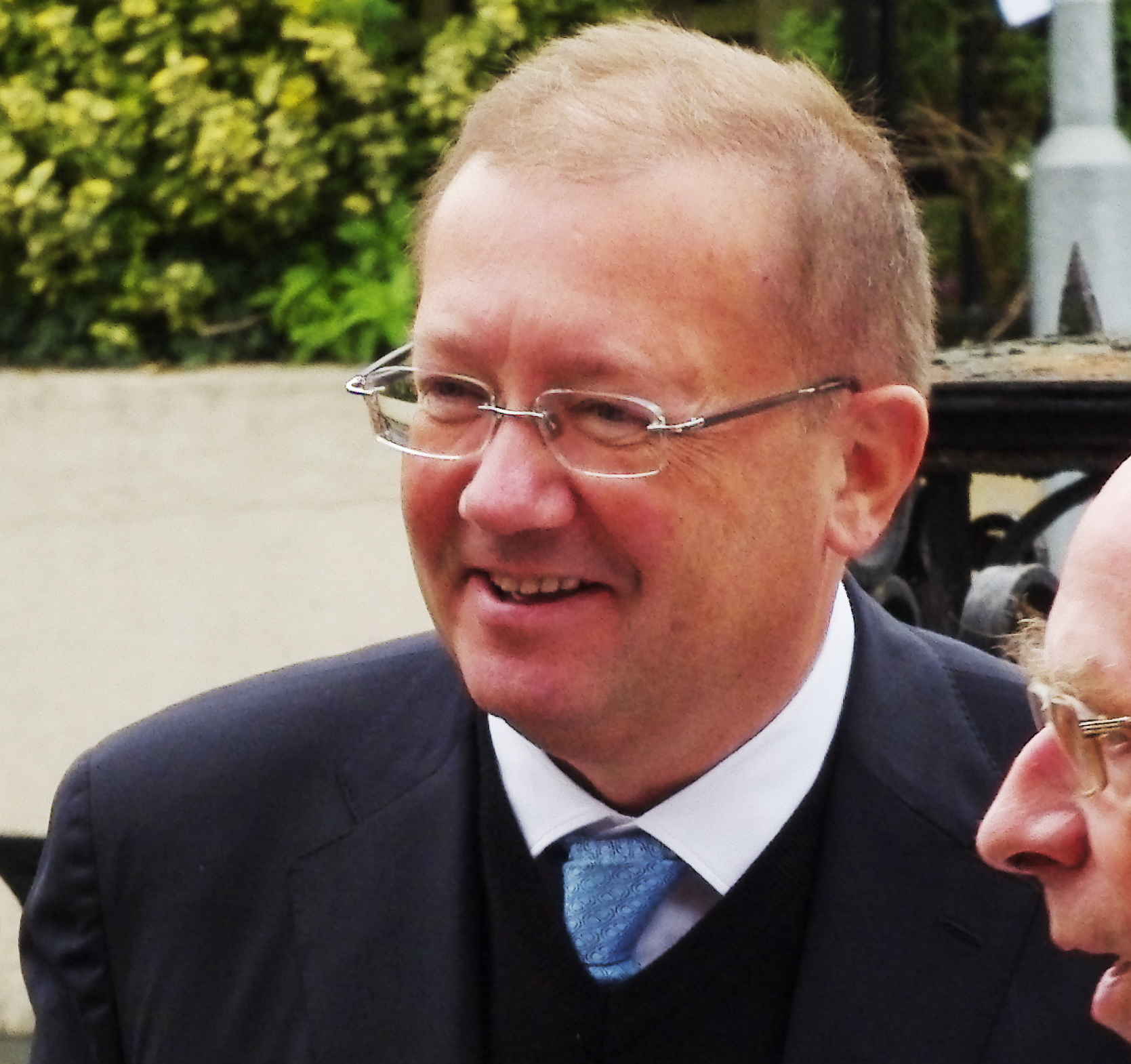
- Yakovenko in 2013

Ambassador of Russia to the United Kingdom
- In office 7 January 2011 – 26 August 2019
- President: Dmitri Medvedev; Vladimir Putin
- Preceded by: Yury Fedotov
- Succeeded by: Andrey Kelin

Personal details
- Born: Alexander Vladimirovich Yakovenko; 21 October 1954 (age 71) Gomel, Belarusian SSR, Soviet Union

Alexander Vladimirovich Yakovenko (Russian: Александр Владимирович Яковенко; born 21 October 1954) is a Russian diplomat. He served as the ambassador of Russia to the United Kingdom between January 2011 and August 2019. Since August 2019, he has been rector of the Diplomatic Academy of the Ministry of Foreign Affairs. He is a former Deputy Minister of Foreign Affairs of Russia. While working at the Ministry of Foreign Affairs in Moscow, he was in charge of multilateral diplomacy (UN, UNESCO, and other international organizations, economic and humanitarian cooperation, human rights, environmental cooperation, climate change, education, culture, and sport issues). A graduate of the Moscow State Institute of International Relations in 1976, he later gained a Doctor of Law degree. Yakovenko holds the diplomatic rank of Ambassador Extraordinary and Plenipotentiary, and speaks Russian, English, and French.

== Career ==
Yakovenko began his diplomatic career in 1976 and has held positions at the Ministry of Foreign Affairs of the Soviet Union, including the Department of International Organizations, the Permanent Mission of the USSR to the United Nations in New York, the Foreign Policy Planning Department, the Department of International Scientific and Technical Cooperation, the Department of Security and Disarmament, the Permanent Mission of the Russian Federation to International Organizations in Vienna, and the Information and Press Department. He has participated in many sessions of the UN Security Council and General Assembly, the UNESCO General Conference, various OSCE forums, negotiations on conventional armed forces in Europe and confidence building measures, the IAEA Board of Governors meetings, the Russian-American Joint Commission on Economic and Technological Cooperation, and the G8 expert meetings. He headed the Russian delegation at the International Space Station negotiations (1993–1998).

=== Ambassador to the UK ===
In January 2011, Yakovenko was appointed by Russian president Dmitry Medvedev to the post of Ambassador of Russia to the United Kingdom, replacing Yury Fedotov.

Yakovenko has written several comment and opinion pieces for the British Daily Telegraph newspaper to clarify his diplomatic position. On 27 February 2019, he was awarded the Order of Alexander Nevsky.

On 24 August 2019, a short note appeared on the website of the Russian Embassy in London stating that "Extraordinary and Plenipotentiary Ambassador of the Russian Federation to the United Kingdom of Great Britain and Northern Ireland Mr Alexander Yakovenko relinquished his duties and departed to Russia. Mr Ivan A. Volodin, Minister-Counsellor, acts as Chargé d'Affaires a.i." On 26 August 2019, President Vladimir Putin relieved Russian ambassador to the United Kingdom Alexander Yakovenko of his duties, with a relevant decree published on the official legal information portal. It was announced on 28 August 2019 that he would become the new rector of the Diplomatic Academy of the Ministry of Foreign Affairs.

== Professional ==
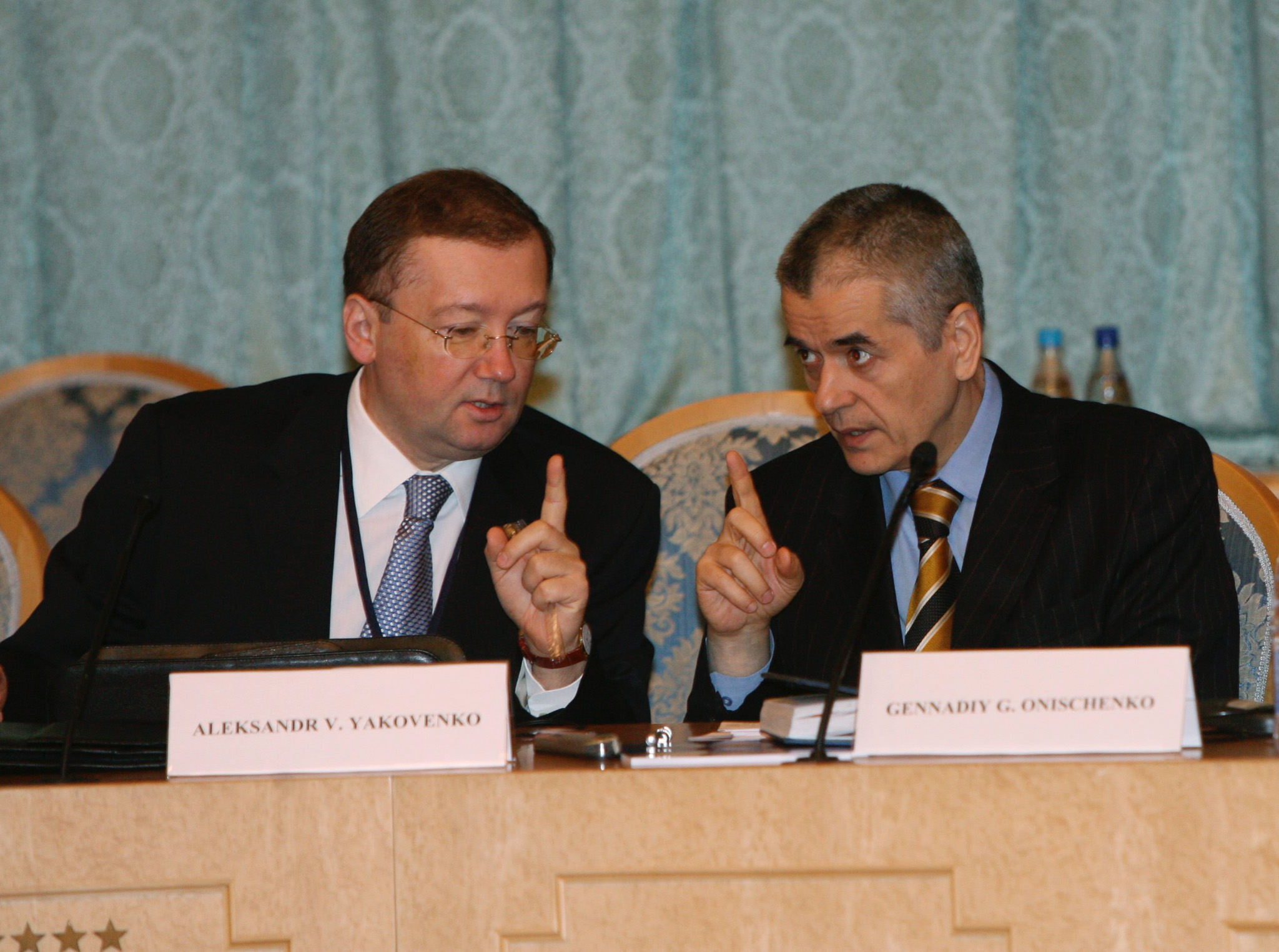
Yakovenko with Gennady Onishchenko, at the 2006 G8 Summit

- 2011–2019 – Ambassador of the Russian Federation to the United Kingdom
- 2005–2011 – Deputy Minister of Foreign Affairs of the Russian Federation
- 2000–2005 – Spokesman, Director of the Information and Press Department, MFA
- 1997–2000 – Deputy Permanent Representative of the Russian Federation to International Organizations in Vienna
- 1995–1997 – Deputy Director of the Department of Security and Disarmament, MFA, Russian representative at the International Science and Technology Center (ISTC) Governing Board (Moscow)
- 1993–1995 – Deputy Director of the Department of International Scientific and Technical Cooperation, MFA
- 1976–1993 – various posts at the Ministry of Foreign Affairs and abroad

== Recent participation in international fora ==
- 2009– – Vice-President of the Durban Review Conference (Geneva), Head of the Russian delegation
- 2000–2009 – UN General Assembly sessions (New York)
- 2000–2009 – UN Security Council meetings (New York)
- 2005–2009 – Head of the Russian delegation at the ECOSOC sessions (Geneva, New-York) 2006-2009 - Head of the Russian delegation at the UNECE Session (Geneva)
- 2006–2009 – Head of the Russian delegation at the Human Rights Council sessions (Geneva)
- 2008–2009 – Head of the Russian delegation at the Alliance of Civilizations annual forum (Madrid, Istanbul)
- 2008– – Head of the Russian delegation at the Special Session of the FAO Conference (Rome) 2008 - Head of the Russian delegation at the UNEP Special Session of the Governing Council/Global Ministerial Environment Forum (Monaco)
- 2007 – Head of the Russian delegation at the UNESCO General Conference (Paris)
- 2007 – Vice-President of the UNIDO General Conference (Vienna), Head of the Russian delegation
- 2006–2007 – Head of the Russian delegation at the UNESCAP Session (Alma-Ata, Kazakhstan; Busan, Republic of Korea)
- 2006 – Russian Representative at the Non-Aligned Movement Summit (Havana)
- 2006 – Head of the Russian delegation at the OECD Ministerial Council Meeting (Paris)

== Academic ==
- Member of the Russian Academy of Natural Sciences (Moscow)
- Member of the Space Council, Russian Academy of Sciences (Moscow)
- Member of the International Institute of Space Law (IISL, Paris)
- Member of the International Academy of Astronautics (IAA, Paris)

== See also ==
- Russian interference in the 2016 Brexit referendum
