= David Alopaeus =

Russian diplomat (1769–1831)

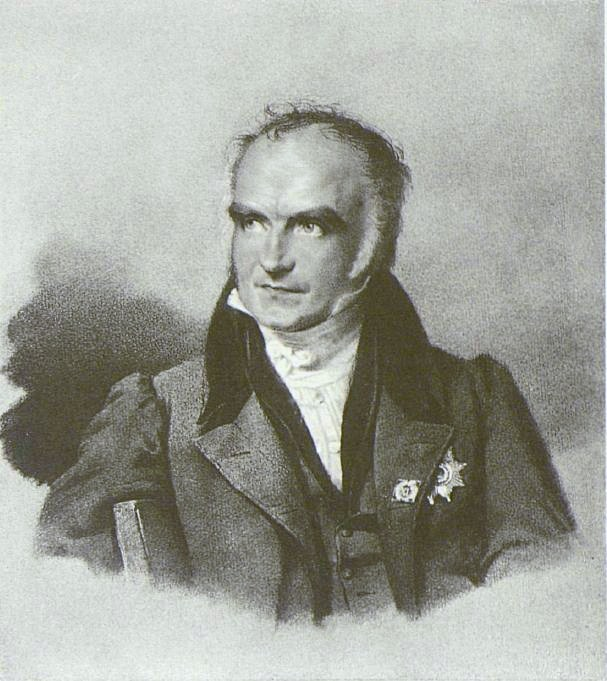
Portrait of Alopaeus, 1830s

Coat of arms of David count Alopaeus

Count Frans David von Alopaeus (also Alopeus; December 19, 1769 – June 13, 1831) was a Russian diplomat from the Finnish Alopaeus noble family.

== Biography ==
Born into the Finnish noble Alopaeus family in Viborg, he followed his older brother Maximilian von Alopaeus into a diplomatic career. He was enrolled at the Military Academy in Stuttgart from 1781 to 1785. He studied at the Georg-August-Universität in Göttingen. He was the Imperial Russian ambassador to Stockholm from 1803, and took part in the negotiations for the Peace of Fredrickshamn in 1809. He was granted a title of Count along with the coat of arms in 1820 in Congress Poland for his negotiations on Congress Poland's borders with Kingdom of Prussia.

== Sources ==
- "Алопеус" . Brockhaus and Efron Encyclopedic Dictionary (in Russian). 1906.
- Frans David Alopaeus
