= Marianne Alopaeus =

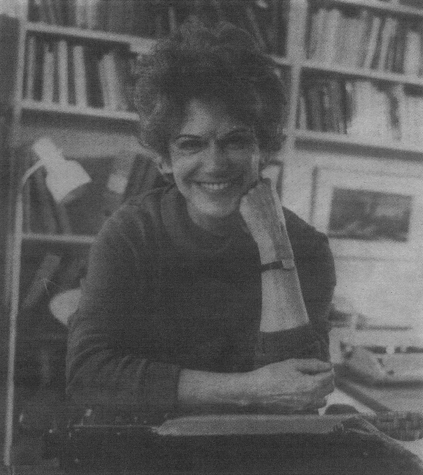
- Born: 9 October 1918; Ekenäs, Finland
- Died: 10 November 2014 (aged 96); Helsinki, Finland
- Occupation: Writer
- Writing career
- Subject: Existentialist

Marianne Alopaeus (9 October 1918 – 10 November 2014) was a Finnish-born writer who published in Swedish.

== Biography ==
Marianne Rosenbröijer was born in Ekenäs in southern Finland on 9 October 1918. She married in 1940 and her first novel was published in 1945 under her married name Alopaeus. The following year, she moved to Sweden. Mörkrets kärna ("The Dark Core") is her best known work and it deals with a woman who rejects the priorities of her children to concentrate on intellectual pursuits. The work is thought to be influenced by the style and approach of the existentialist Simone de Beauvoir. This book was nominated for the Nordic Council Literature Prize. In 1947, she was awarded the Finnish Thanks for the Book Award (Kiitos kirjasta -mitali in Finnish). Her books have been translated into Finnish and Norwegian.

She also lived in the United States and in France and moved to Sweden again in 1973. Ten years later, she wrote Drabbad av Sverige which deals with what it is to be Swedish. Only a week before her death, she was moved back to Finland, and she died in Helsinki in November 2014.

== Works ==
- 1945 – Uppbrott
- 1950 – Dröm utan slut
- 1953 – Utanför
- 1959 – Avsked i Augusti
- 1965 – Mörkrets kärna
- 1971 – Betraktelser kring en gräns (a collection of essays)
- 1983 – Drabbad av Sverige (a collection of essays)
