= List of ambassadors of Russia to Sweden =

Ambassador of the Russian Federation to the Kingdom of Sweden
- Emblem of the Russian Foreign Ministry

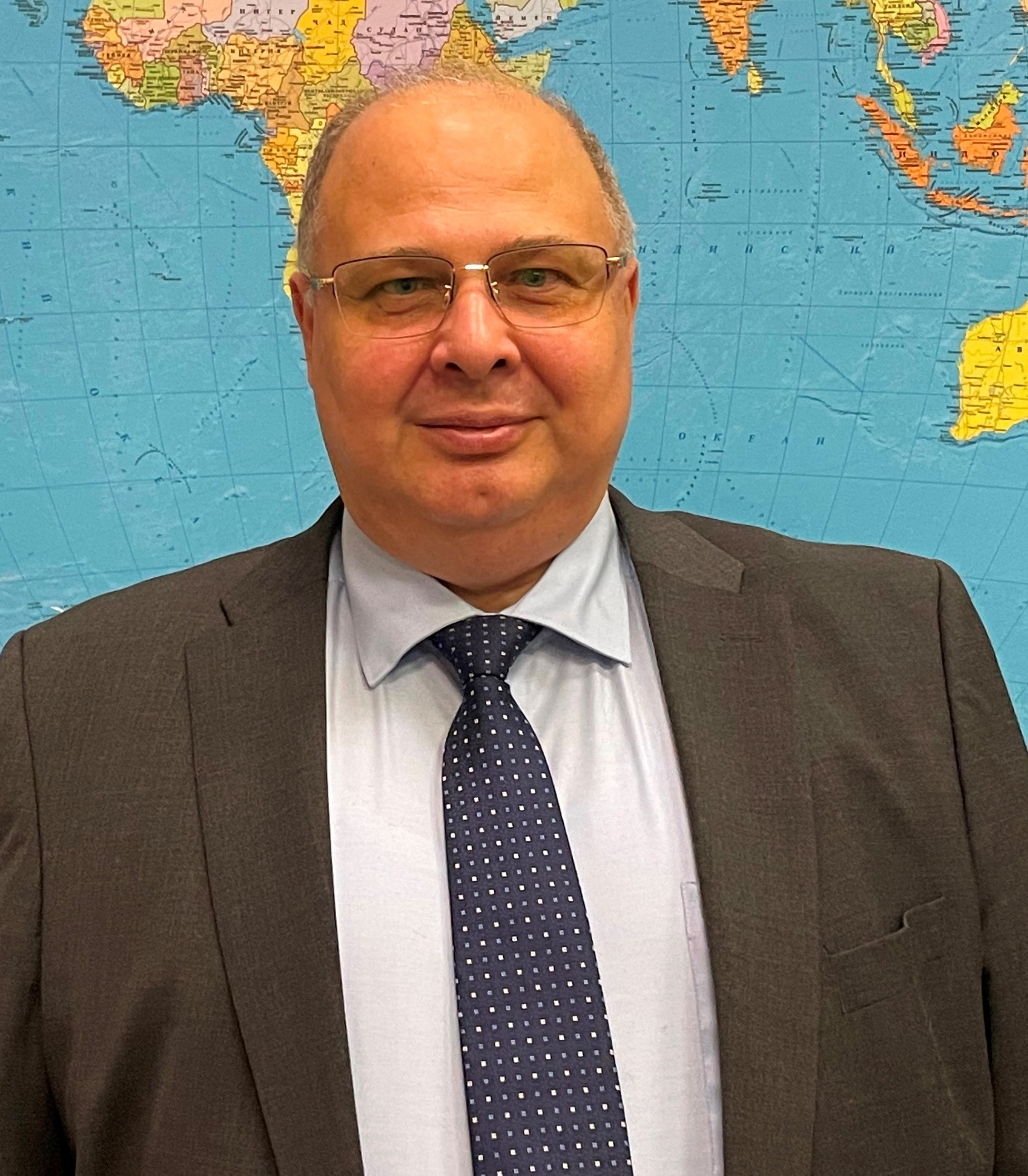
- Incumbent; Sergey Belyayev since 25 October 2024
- Ministry of Foreign Affairs; Embassy of Russia in Stockholm
- Style: His Excellency; The Honourable
- Reports to: Minister of Foreign Affairs
- Seat: Stockholm
- Appointer: President of Russia
- Term length: At the pleasure of the president
- Website: Embassy of Russia in Sweden

The ambassador of Russia to Sweden is the official representative of the president and the government of the Russian Federation to the king and the government of Sweden.

The ambassador and his staff work at large in the Russian embassy in Stockholm. There is a consulate-general in Gothenburg, and a consulate in Malmö. The current Russian ambassador to Sweden is Sergey Belyayev, incumbent since 25 October 2024.

== History of diplomatic relations ==
Diplomatic relations between the forerunners of the modern states of Sweden and Russia date back to the seventeenth century. Much of the early contact was marked with conflict as Russia extended its borders into regions around the Baltic controlled by Sweden. Some early representatives were Dmitry Frantsbekov, sent on a diplomatic mission by Tsar Mikhail Fyodorovich between 1634 and 1636, and Andrey Khilkov, sent by Peter the Great in 1700. The Great Northern War began shortly after his appointment and Khilkov spent the next eighteen years imprisoned in Sweden until his death. Peace between Russia and Sweden was only secured in 1721 with the signing of the Treaty of Nystad. Mikhail Bestuzhev-Ryumin was appointed as envoy that year, representing the newly declared Russian Empire.

Relations were broken off several times during the eighteenth century as Sweden and Russia fought several wars. The first was the Russo-Swedish War which broke out in 1741, and ended with the signing of the Treaty of Åbo in 1743. Further ruptures occurred with the 1788–1790 Russo-Swedish War, ended with the Treaty of Värälä, and the Finnish War between 1808 and 1809, settled with the Treaty of Fredrikshamn. A period of extended peace between the two countries followed, which lasted until the early nineteenth century. Relations were maintained during the First World War, and after the February Revolution in 1917 overthrew the Russian monarchy and established the Russian Provisional Government. Relations were soon established with the new regime after the October Revolution brought the Bolshevik regime to power. Vatslav Vorovsky served as diplomatic representative of the Russian Soviet Federative Socialist Republic between 1917 and 1919, and was succeeded by Platon Kerzhentsev between 1921 and 1923. In 1923, with the establishment of the Soviet Union, Valerian Obolensky became the new diplomatic representative, upgraded to plenipotentiary representative in 1924.

Relations were maintained throughout the twentieth century between the two states, including the long tenure of Alexandra Kollontai, who served as representative between 1930 and 1945, at first as plenipotentiary representative until 1943, and thereafter as ambassador after the missions were upgraded to embassies. With the dissolution of the Soviet Union in 1991, Sweden recognised the Russian Federation as its successor state. The incumbent Soviet ambassador, Oleg Grinevsky, served as ambassador of the Russian Federation until 1997, with representatives continuing to be exchanged between the two countries.

== List of representatives of Russia to Sweden (1634–present) ==
=== Tsardom of Russia to Sweden (1634–1700) ===
Name	Title	Appointment	Termination	Notes
Dmitry Frantsbekov	Resident	1634	1636	
Andrey Khilkov	Resident	July 1700	September 1700	
Great Northern War - Diplomatic relations interrupted (1700-1721)

=== Russian Empire to Sweden (1721–1917) ===
Name	Title	Appointment	Termination	Notes
Mikhail Bestuzhev-Ryumin	Minister Plenipotentiary until 1724; Envoy after 1724	1721	1725	
Vasily Dolgorukov	Ambassador	September 1725	May 1727	
Nikolai Golovin	Envoy Extraordinary	1725	January 1732	
Mikhail Bestuzhev-Ryumin	Envoy	1731	1741	
Russo-Swedish War (1741–1743) - Diplomatic relations interrupted (1741-1743)
Johann von Pott	Envoy	3 January 1744	12 December 1745	
Aleksey Pushkin	Envoy	25 May 1745	23 January 1746	
Johann Albrecht Korff	Envoy	23 January 1746	31 January 1748	
Nikita Panin	Envoy	1748	1760	
Ivan Osterman	Envoy	1760	1774	
Johann Matthias von Simolin	Envoy	1774	1779	
Aleksey Musin-Pushkin	Envoy	3 July 1779	24 November 1783	
Arkady Morkov	Envoy	15 March 1783	19 May 1786	
Andrey Razumovsky	Envoy	19 May 1786	1789	
Russo-Swedish War (1788–1790) - Diplomatic relations interrupted (1788–1790)
Otto von Stackelberg	Envoy	April 1791	May 1793	
Sergey Rumyantsev	Ambassador	June 1793	June 1794	
Bogdan Budberg	Chargé d'affaires	1795	1796	
Andreas von Budberg	Envoy	16 May 1796	9 February 1803	
David Alopaeus	Envoy	29 June 1803	27 January 1808	
Finnish War - Diplomatic relations interrupted (1808–1809)
Jan Pieter van Suchtelen	Special mission	28 October 1809	1811	
Pavel Nikolai	Chargé d'affaires	2 July 1811	30 August 1812	
Grigory Stroganov	Envoy	15 September 1812	2 July 1816	
Jan Pieter van Suchtelen	Envoy	1816	6 January 1836	
Alexander de Bodisco	Chargé d'affaires	17 January 1836	16 March 1837	
Lev Pototsky	Envoy	20 June 1836	31 May 1839	
Adam Matushevich	Envoy	31 May 1839	20 May 1842	
Dmitry Glinka	Chargé d'affaires	22 May 1841	14 March 1844	
Aleksandr Kridener	Envoy	6 December 1843	6 January 1852	
Yakov Dashkov	Envoy	26 February 1852	28 February 1872	
Nikolay Girs	Envoy	4 March 1872	2 December 1875	
Grigory Okunev	Envoy	6 December 1875	19 December 1883	
Nikolai Shishkin	Envoy	8 February 1884	12 March 1891	
Ivan Zinoviev	Envoy	12 March 1891	1 July 1897	
Yevgeny Blyudov	Envoy	1 July 1897	1904	
Fyodor Budberg	Envoy	1904	17 June 1909	
Vasily Sergeyev	Envoy	1910	1910	
Kirill Naryshkin	Envoy	1910	1912	
Aleksandr Savinsky	Envoy	1912	1913	
Anatoly Neklyudov	Envoy	1913	April 1917	

=== Russian Provisional Government to Sweden (1917) ===
Name	Title	Appointment	Termination	Notes
Konstantin Gulkevich	Envoy	April 1917	December 1917	

=== Russian Soviet Federative Socialist Republic to Sweden (1917-1923) ===
Name	Title	Appointment	Termination	Notes
Vatslav Vorovsky	Diplomatic representative	November 1917	1919	
Platon Kerzhentsev	Diplomatic representative	February 1921	10 March 1923	

=== Soviet Union to Sweden (1923–1991) ===
Name	Title	Appointment	Termination	Notes
Valerian Obolensky	Diplomatic representative before 22 March 1924; Plenipotentiary Representative after 17 April 1924	4 June 1923	7 October 1924	Credentials presented on 23 May 1924
Valerian Dovgalevsky	Plenipotentiary Representative	7 October 1924	5 February 1927	Credentials presented on 28 November 1924
Viktor Kopp	Plenipotentiary Representative	5 February 1927	27 May 1930	Credentials presented on 14 March 1927
Alexandra Kollontai	Plenipotentiary Representative before 9 May 1941; Envoy after 9 May 1941	20 July 1930	27 July 1945	Credentials presented on 30 October 1930
Ivan Chernyshyov	Envoy before 2 October 1947; Ambassador after 2 October 1947	27 July 1945	27 October 1949	Credentials presented on 20 September 1945
Aleksandr Abramov	Ambassador	27 October 1949	12 March 1950	Did not take up post
Konstantin Rodionov	Ambassador	13 March 1950	22 December 1956	Credentials presented on 26 April 1950
Fedor Gusev	Ambassador	22 December 1956	31 July 1962	Credentials presented on 2 April 1957
Nikolai Belokhvostikov	Ambassador	31 July 1962	8 April 1967	Credentials presented on 10 September 1962
Viktor Maltsev	Ambassador	8 April 1967	16 May 1971	Credentials presented on 9 May 1967
Mikhail Yakovlev	Ambassador	16 May 1971	4 September 1982	Credentials presented on 30 June 1971
Boris Pankin	Ambassador	4 September 1982	14 May 1990	Credentials presented on 30 September 1982
Nikolai Uspensky	Ambassador	1990	22 October 1991	
Oleg Grinevsky	Ambassador	22 October 1991	25 December 1991	

=== Russian Federation to Sweden (1991–present) ===
Name	Title	Appointment	Termination	Notes
Oleg Grinevsky	Ambassador	25 December 1991	19 June 1997	
Aleksey Nikiforov	Ambassador	23 October 1997	31 May 2001	
Nikolai Sadchikov	Ambassador	31 May 2001	5 August 2005	
Alexander Kadakin	Ambassador	5 August 2005	4 September 2009	
Igor Neverov	Ambassador	4 September 2009	7 May 2014	
Viktor Tatarintsev	Ambassador	7 May 2014	25 October 2024	Credentials presented on 9 June 2014
Sergey Belyayev	Ambassador	25 October 2024		Credentials presented on 5 December 2024

== See also ==
- List of ambassadors of Sweden to Russia
