= Andrey Khilkov =

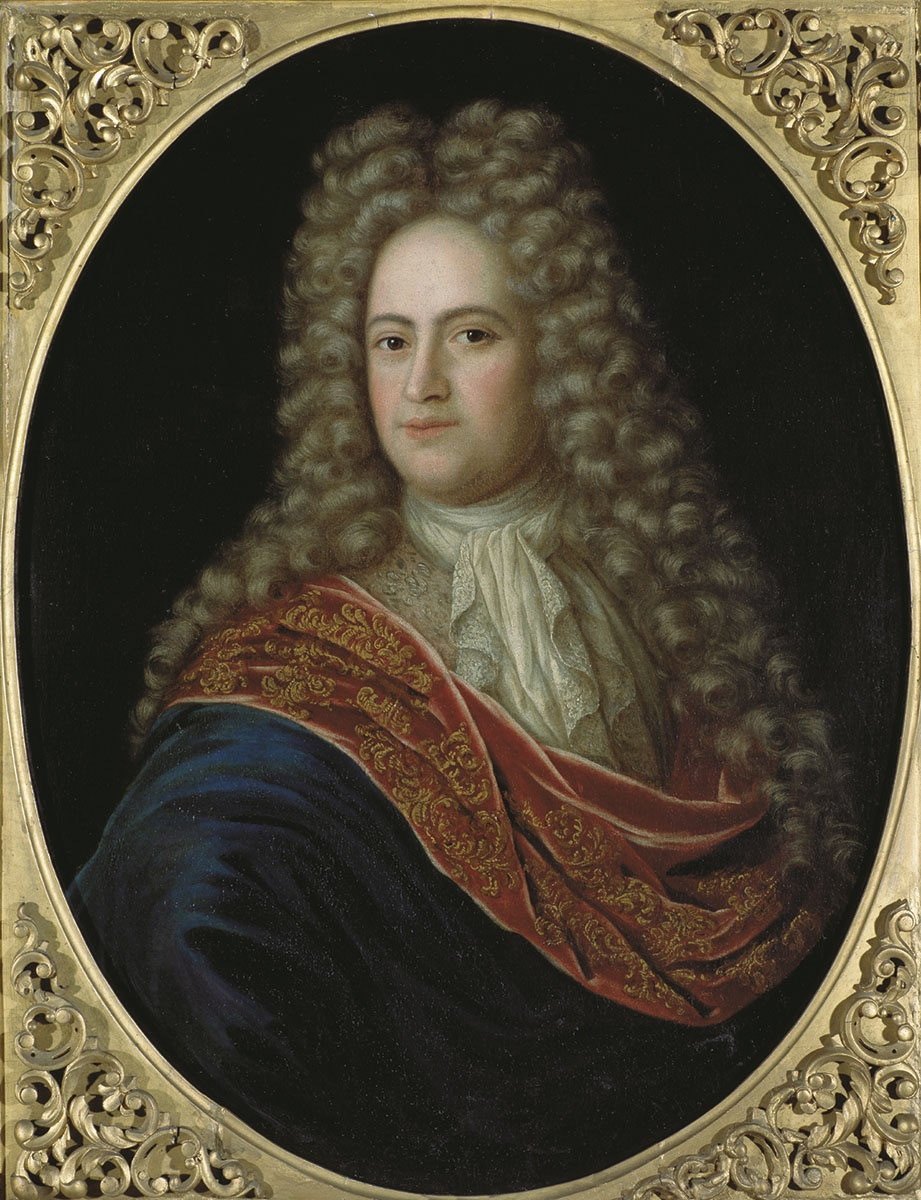
Prince Andrey Yakovlevich Khilkov, unknown painter, 1710s

Prince Andrey Yakovlevich Khilkov (1676–1716) was the Russian ambassador to Sweden.

== Biography ==
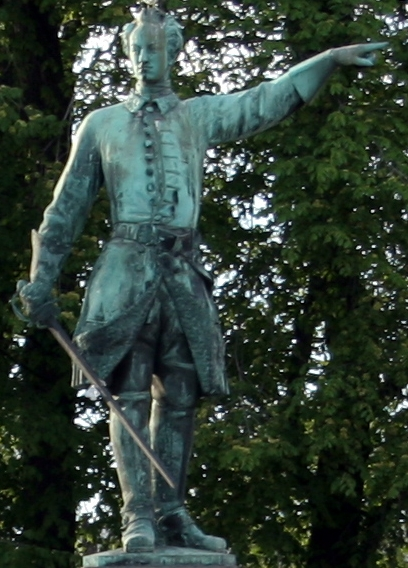
Part of the Monument to Charles XII in Stockholm, with Charles pointing towards Russia.

In 1697, Prince Khilkov, in the capacity of a stolnik was sent with a number of others to Italy to study navigation and shipbuilding. Soon after his return to Russia he was sent as ambassador to Sweden (June 1700), and instructed to inform Charles XII of the imminent arrival of great envoys (boyar Prince Yakov Dolgrukiy and okolnichiy Prince Fyodor Shakhovsky) for the solemn confirmation of the peace agreements with Sweden.

Peter the Great sent an ambassador to Stockholm exclusively in order to lull the Swedish Government into a false sense of security, and to conceal from it his preparations for war with Sweden, which he decided to begin as soon as peace was concluded with Turkey.

Not finding the King in Stockholm, Prince Khilkov followed the king to the shores of Denmark, and here, on 19 August 1700, on the royal yacht, he gave Charles XII a scroll and according to orders, made a speech in Italian. At the audience which followed on 30 August, the King announced that the message was "very agreeable", and that he recognised Prince Khilkov as an ambassador to his Court. At the very same time, on 19 August, war was declared on Sweden "for their many wrongs" in Moscow, and the army was ordered to attack Swedish towns. As soon as the news reached Sweden, a month later the Russian ambassador was arrested and his house put under guard; Prince Khilkov did not protest, telling the Swedish Master of Ceremonies that "in their own country they might do as they pleased".

The Swedish Government told Prince Khilkov that it was prepared to exchange him for the Swedish ambassador in Moscow, Knipper, but later refused to do this and Prince Khilkov remained in captivity for 15 years and died there.

The Swedes treated Prince Khilkov extremely badly, as they did the Russian generals and officers who fell into their hands later as prisoners of war. Prince Khilkov informed Emperor Peter in 1703 "Better to be a prisoner of the Turks than the Swedes: here a Russian is of no account, they insult and dishonour him; I and the generals are under constant guard; if anyone needs to go somewhere, a guard with a loaded musket is always with him; they torture our merchants with heavy labours, despite all my representations".

In 1711 most of the prisoners of war were exchanged, but Prince Khilkov remained in Sweden. In 1713 he was moved from Stockholm to Västerås; "at this time," he wrote to the Emperor', I a prisoner am not able to serve your Highness in any way". However, even in this small provincial town he tried to ascertain and inform Peter of the Swedish political news. In one of his unpublished messages, now in the State archives, we find a report of the Swedish administrative reforms of 1714. "The king recently sent a lieutenant colonel to Stockholm with a number of certificates of rank for his subjects, among which were certificates for a new rank, which has never before existed in Sweden: ombudsrod - a rank nearest to a boyar. Six of these Ombudsrods have been created. Justitiae, Military Affairs, Exchequer, Trade Affairs, First Foreign Affairs, German Affairs".

Prince Khilkov died in Västerås in 1716; his body was brought to Petersburg in 1718 and buried in the Alexander Nevsky monastery, 18 October 1719.

== Sources ==
- "Хилков, Андрей Яковлевич" . Brockhaus and Efron Encyclopedic Dictionary (in Russian). 1906.
- Kravets, S. L., ed. (2017). "Хилков, Андрей Яковлевич". Большая Российская энциклопедия. Том 34: Хвойка — Шервинский (in Russian). Большая Российская энциклопедия. pp. 47–48. ISBN 978-5-85270-372-9.
