= Alopaeus =

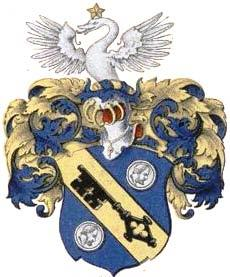
Coat of arms of the Alopaeus family

The Alopaeus family (sometimes transliterated as Alopeus) is the name of Baltic-German noble family of Eastern Finnish descent, originating from Vyborg.

== History ==
Members of the family played an important political and ecclesiastical role in the history of Russia, Finland and Sweden. Some of them have fennicized the name to Kettunen or Tuomas-Kettunen. They were ennobled in 1772 with the name Nordensvan, as part of the Swedish nobility and in 1782 as part of the nobility in the Duchy of Courland. Later, the family was awarded with the title of Baron in the Grand Duchy of Finland and Count in the Kingdom of Poland. Most notable members of the family served the Russian Empire as diplomats, which enabled them, in time, to get incorporated into the Russian nobility.

== Notable members ==
- Johan Alopaeus (1731–1811), ennobled in 1772 with the name Nordensvan
- Baron Maximilian von Alopeus (1748–1822), Russian diplomat
- Count Frans David Alopaeus (1769–1831), his brother, also a diplomat
- Count Fredrik Alopaeus (1810–1862), Finnish general in the Imperial Russian Army, younger son of David
- Maunu Jaakko Alopaeus, Bishop of Porvoo 1809–1818
- Carl Henrik Alopaeus, Bishop of Porvoo 1885–1892
- Erik Alopaeus, first Finnish Parliamentary Ombudsman in 1920
- Marianne Alopaeus (born 1918), Finnish author

== See also ==
- Swedish-speaking Finns

== Sources ==
- "Алопеус" . Brockhaus and Efron Encyclopedic Dictionary (in Russian). 1906.
