= Hryniewski =

Hryniewski (feminine: Hryniewska) is a Polish-language surname. It was transliterated as a Russian-language surname Grinevsky. It may refer to:

- Henryk Hryniewski (1869–1937), Polish-Georgian painter, graphic artist, and illustrator
- Jerzy Hryniewski (1895–1978), Polish politician, 36th Prime Minister of Poland and 6th Prime Minister of the Polish Government in Exile
