= Oleg Grinevsky =

Russian diplomat (1930–2019)

- Олег Гриневский

Ambassador of Russia to Sweden
- In office 25 December 1991 – 19 June 1997
- Succeeded by: Aleksey Nikiforov

Ambassador of the USSR to Sweden
- In office 22 October 1991 – 25 December 1991
- Preceded by: Nikolai Uspensky

Personal details
- Born: Oleg Alekseyevich Grinevsky; 3 June 1930 Moscow, Russian SFSR, Soviet Union
- Died: 5 February 2019 (aged 88)
- Education: Moscow State Institute of International Relations
- Awards: Order of Friendship of Peoples; Order of the Badge of Honour (twice); Order of the Polar Star Commander 1st Class

Oleg Alekseyevich Grinevsky (Russian: Олег Алексеевич Гриневский; 3 June 1930 – 5 February 2019) was a Russian diplomat, former Ambassador to Sweden, political scientist, Cand.Sc. (history) and author.

== Early life ==
Oleg Grinevsky was born in Moscow, in what was then the Russian SFSR, part of the Soviet Union.

== Diplomatic activity ==
- Ambassador Extraordinary and Plenipotentiary.
- former Soviet security adviser to the Nikita Khrushchev, Leonid Brezhnev, Yuri Andropov, Mikhail Gorbachev and Boris Yeltsin governments
- Graduated from MGIMO (Moscow State Institute for International Relations) in 1954.
- Joined the Ministry of Foreign Affairs, USSR in 1957.
- Senior Adviser at the Soviet Embassy in Washington, D.C., 1954.
- 1983-1989 Head of the Soviet delegation at the Stockholm conference
- 1989-1991 Head of the Soviet delegation at the Vienna conference
- 1991-1997 Russian Ambassador to Sweden
- Since 1999 - scientist, political researcher, author of political and historical books
- Awarded the Swedish Order of the Polar Star (2009)

== International conferences activity ==
- Participated in the numerous international conferences on security and nuclear security issues.
