= Grigory Karasin =

Russian diplomat

- Григорий Карасин
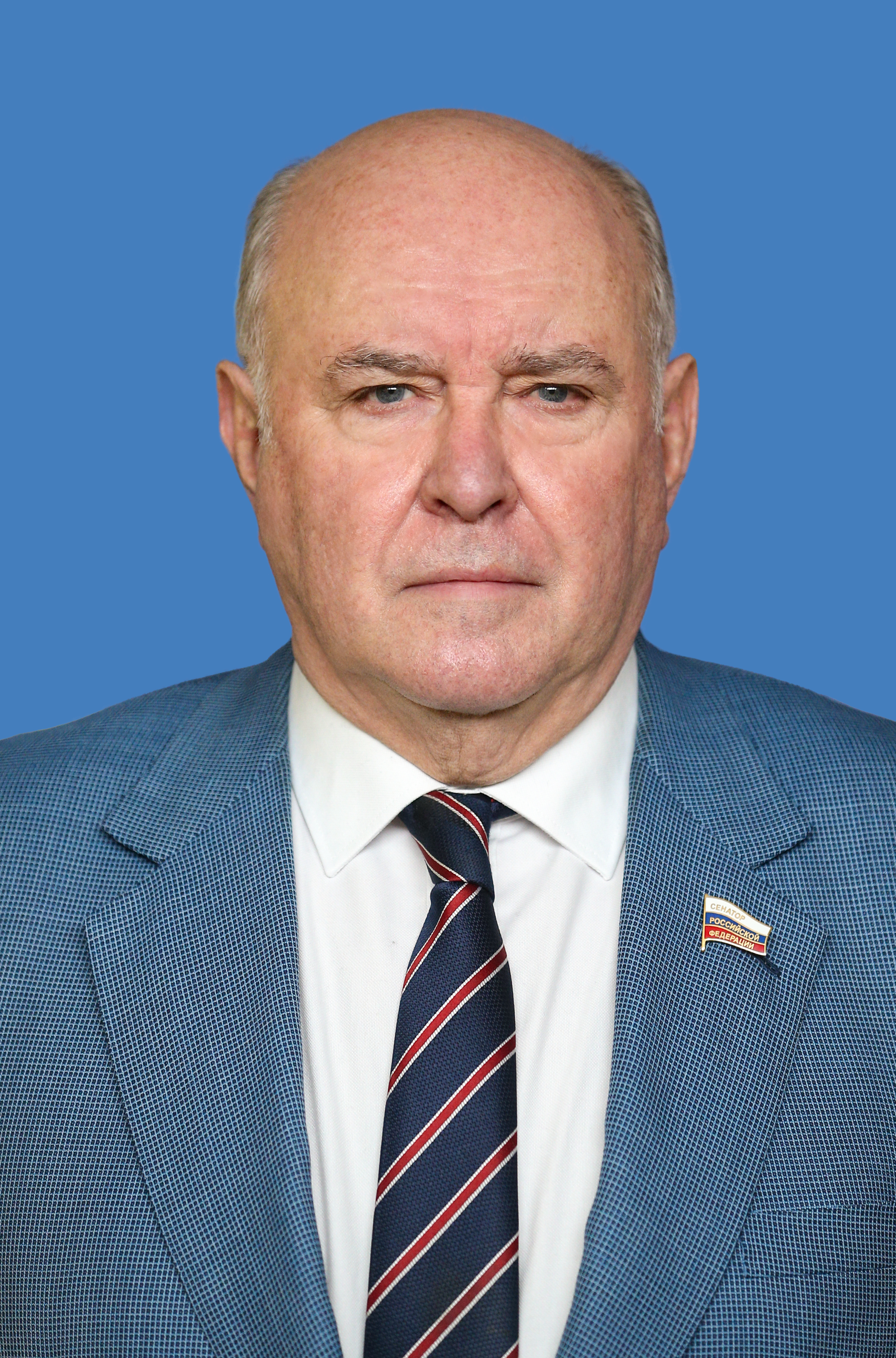
- Karasin in 2018

Russian Federation Senator from Sakhalin Oblast
- Incumbent
- Assumed office 12 September 2019
- Preceded by: Dmitry Mezentsev

Deputy Minister of Foreign Affairs — State Secretary
- In office June 2005 – 10 September 2019

Ambassador to the United Kingdom
- In office 6 March 2000 – 9 June 2005
- Preceded by: Yury Fokin
- Succeeded by: Yury Feladotov

Director of the Department of Information and Press of the Ministry of Foreign Affairs
- In office 1993–1996
- Preceded by: Sergey Yastrzhembsky
- Succeeded by: Gennady Tarasov

Personal details
- Born: 23 August 1949 (age 77) Moscow, Russian SFSR, Soviet Union
- Education: Moscow State University

Grigory Borisovich Karasin (Russian: Григорий Борисович Карасин; born 23 August 1949) is a Russian politician and diplomat is currently the Senator from Sakhalin Oblast since 12 September 2019.

He served as a State Secretary and a Deputy Minister of Foreign Affairs of Russia from 2005 to 2019, and had served as the ambassador to the United Kingdom from 2000 to 2005.

== Career ==
Karasin graduated from the Institute of Oriental Languages at Moscow State University in 1971, and went on to work in various diplomatic posts in the central offices of the Ministry of Foreign Affairs and abroad.

From March 2000 to June 2005, Karasin was the Ambassador of Russia to the United Kingdom, and returned to Moscow in June 2005 to take up the position of Deputy Minister of Foreign Affairs; since October 2005, he is also a State Secretary.

On 12 September 2019, he was appointed a member of the Federation Council, a representative of the Executive of the Sakhalin oblast, by the decree of the Governor Valery Limarenko.

Karasin speaks Russian, English, Hausa and French.

=== Sanctions ===
He was sanctioned by the UK government in 2022 in relation to the Russo-Ukrainian War.

== See also ==
- Ambassador of Russia to the United Kingdom
