= Maximilian von Alopaeus =

Rusisan diplomat (1748–1822)

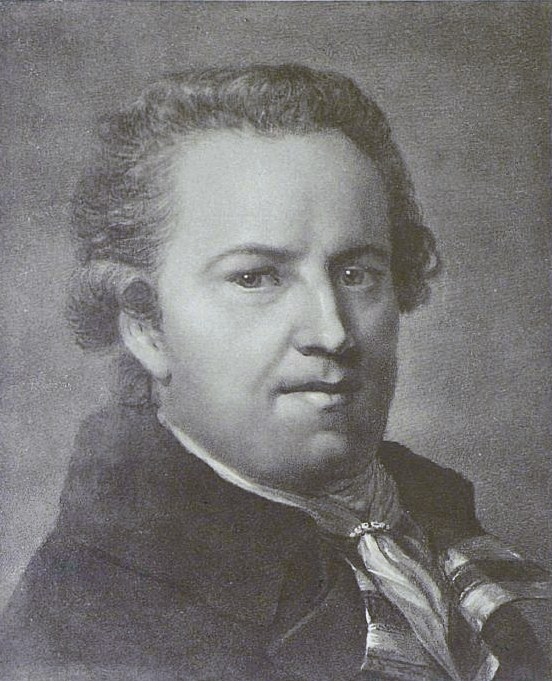
Portrait, 1790s

Magnus Maximilian Graf von Alopaeus (Russian: Алопеус Максим Максимович, romanized: Alopeus Maksim Maksimovich; 21 January 1748 – 16 May 1822) was a Russian diplomat of Finnish-Swedish descent.

== Biography ==
Maximilian was born at Vyborg and educated at Åbo, afterwards at Göttingen, was intended for the ecclesiastical profession, but his employment as secretary by Count Nikita Ivanovich Panin, Russian ambassador at the Swedish court, was the first step in a gradual rise through the political ranks. In 1783, Alopaeus was appointed resident-minister at the court of the Bishop of Lübeck, where he maintained the correspondence between Tsesarevich Paul and Frederick II. In 1789, Alopaeus was sent to Berlin where he stayed for 6 years, gained favor from Frederick William II, and secured the signing of the allied treaty between Russia and Prussia. He was named minister plenipotentiary at the court of Berlin, by the Empress Catherine, in 1790.

In 1795, Prussia having withdrawn from the coalition by the Treaty of Basel, he remonstrated; and in 1796, he left Berlin, to which court he did not return till 1802. In 1802, he was appointed envoy at the Prussian court. The rapprochement of Russia and Prussia in 1806 to a considerable degree is due to his work. In 1807, he was sent to London as an ambassador, but the peace of Tilsit put his mission to an end.

Alopaeus participated in the Congress of Aix-la-Chapelle. He retired from diplomacy in 1820, to Frankfort-on-the-Main, where he lived till his death. He is said to have left very valuable manuscript memoirs.

He was followed on his diplomatic career by his younger brother David Alopaeus.

== Personal life ==
He was married to Friederike Wilhelmine Henriette Antoinette von Quast (1765–1796). Their daughter Natalie (1796–1823) was married to Count Konstantin von Benckendorff.

== Books ==
- Rede Ihrer Majestät der glorwürdigst regierenden Kaiserin von Russland Catharinen der Zweyten bey seiner Aufnahme, als Beysitzer in die Königliche Deutsche Gesellschaft zu Göttingen den 24ten September, 1768 devotest gewidmet von Magnus Alopäus aus Wiburg, Beysitzern des Königl. Historichen Instituts., Göttingen, gedruckt bey Johann Albrecht Barmeier, 1768, Libris.se

== See also ==
- Alopaeus (family)

== Sources ==
- "Алопеус" . Brockhaus and Efron Encyclopedic Dictionary (in Russian). 1906.
- Tuomas-Kettunen, Erik (1990). Keisarin omapäinen suomalainen. Maximilian Alopeuksen dokumentaarinen elämäntarina (in Finnish). WSOY. p. 298. ISBN 978-951-0-16695-6. Archived from the original on 2011-05-17.
