= Nordensvan =

Nordensvan is a surname. Notable people with the surname include:

- Carl Nordensvan (1892–1980), Finnish soldier and automobile businessman
- Carl Otto Nordensvan (1851–1924), Swedish general and military writer
