= Philipp von Brunnow =

Diplomat in the Russian Empire (1797–1875)

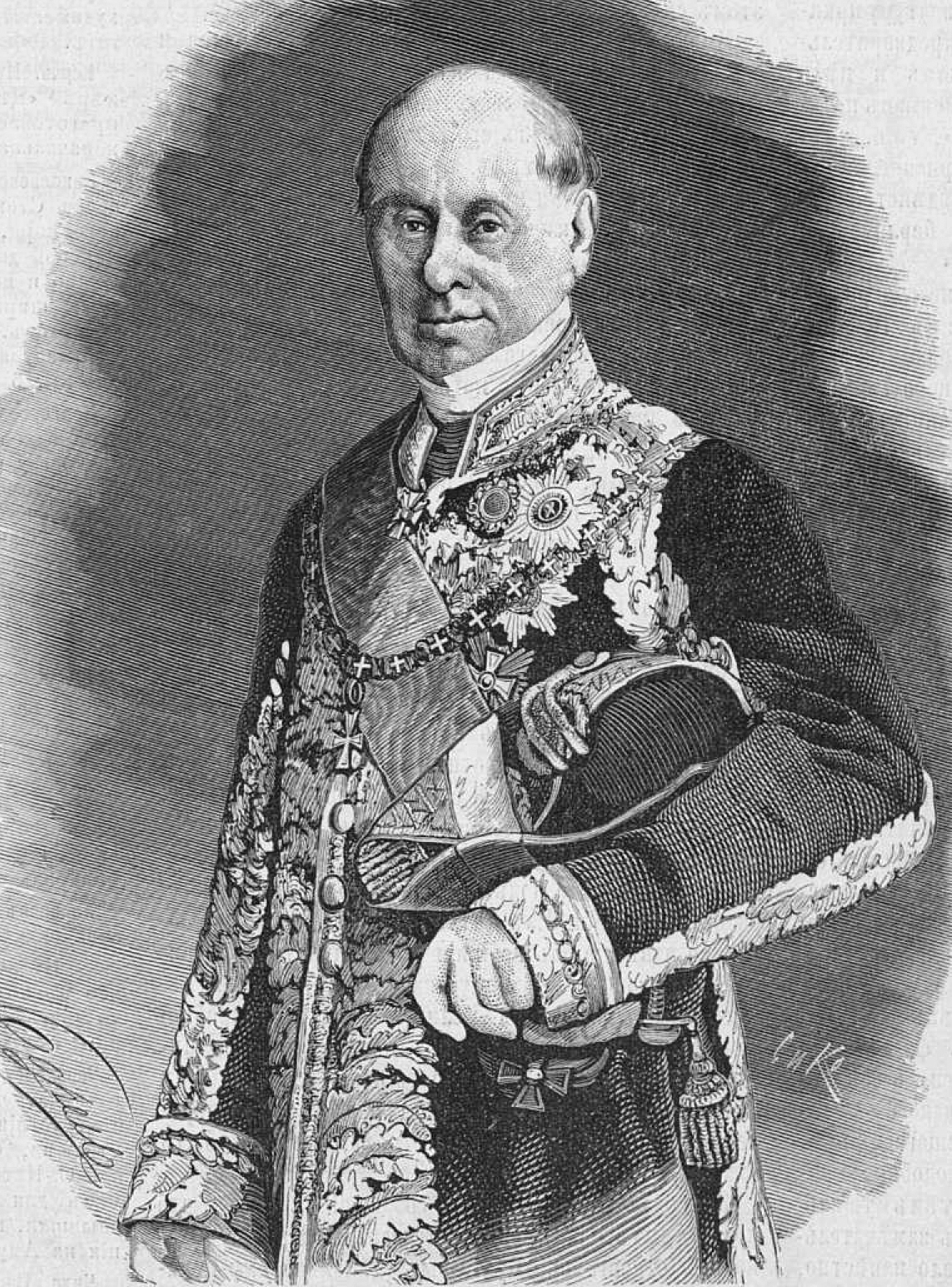
Count Philipp von Brunnow

Ernst Philipp Graf von Brunnow (31 August 1797, Dresden – 12 April 1875, Darmstadt) was a Baltic German diplomat who served in the Russian Empire.

== Diplomatic roles ==
Brunnow represented Russia in several conferences, and held ambassadorial positions in London (1840–1854), Frankfurt (1855), Berlin (1856), and then returned to London (1858–1874).

== Honours ==
- Knight Grand Cross of the Legion of Honour.
- Knight Grand Cross of the Order of Saint Stanislaus.
- Knight Grand Cross of the Order of the Red Eagle.
- Knight Grand Cross of the Order of the Netherlands Lion.
- Knight of the Order of the Gold Lion of the House of Nassau.
- Commander of the Order of St. Stephen of Hungary.
- Order of Saint Vladimir
- Order of Saint Anna
- Order of the White Eagle.
- Imperial Order of Saint Alexander Nevsky
- Order of St. Andrew the Apostle the First-Called
