= Quast =

Quast is a surname of German and Dutch origin.

== Notable members ==
- Anne Quast (born 1937), American amateur golfer
- Brad Quast (born 1968), All-conference football player
- Ferdinand von Quast (1850–1939), Prussian military officer, participant in the Franco-Prussian War and a general in the First World War
- Jan Quast (born 1970), Boxer from Germany
- John Quast (1900–1966), American football end
- Matthijs Quast (died 1641), Dutch explorer
- Pieter Quast (1605-06–1647), Dutch Golden Age painter and draughtsman
- Philip Quast (born 1957), Australian actor and singer
