= 2019–20 Portsmouth F.C. season =

Portsmouth
2019–20 season
- Chairman: Michael Eisner
- Manager: Kenny Jackett
- Stadium: Fratton Park
- League One: 5th (1.71 PPG)
- FA Cup: Fifth round
- EFL Cup: Third round
- EFL Trophy: Runners-up
- Top goalscorer: League: Ronan Curtis (11); All: Ronan Curtis (14); John Marquis (14)
- Highest home attendance: 18,801 vs. Ipswich Town (21 December 2019)
- Lowest home attendance: 16,577 vs. MK Dons (25 February 2020)
Home colours	Away colours	Third colours

The 2019–20 season was Portsmouth's third consecutive season in the EFL League One. Along with competing in League One, the club also participated in the FA Cup, EFL Cup and EFL Trophy. The season covers the period from 1 July 2019 to 30 June 2020.

== Players ==
=== Squad ===
As of 2 May 2020

Note: Flags indicate national team as defined under FIFA eligibility rules; some limited exceptions apply. Players may hold more than one non-FIFA nationality.

No.	Pos.	Nation	Player
1	GK	SCO	Craig MacGillivray
3	DF	ENG	Lee Brown
4	MF	ENG	Tom Naylor (captain)
5	DF	ENG	Paul Downing
6	DF	ENG	Christian Burgess
7	FW	IND	Ryan Williams
8	FW	Jersey	Brett Pitman
9	FW	ENG	Oliver Hawkins
10	FW	ENG	John Marquis
11	FW	IRL	Ronan Curtis
13	DF	ENG	James Bolton
14	MF	ENG	Andy Cannon
15	MF	SCO	Ross McCrorie (on loan from Rangers)
16	DF	ENG	Jack Whatmough
17	MF	ENG	Bryn Morris

No.	Pos.	Nation	Player
18	FW	LCA	Reeco Hackett
19	FW	WAL	Marcus Harness
20	DF	ENG	Sean Raggett (on loan from Norwich City)
22	FW	WAL	Ellis Harrison
24	MF	ENG	Cameron McGeehan (on loan from Barnsley)
26	MF	ENG	Gareth Evans
30	MF	ENG	Adam May
31	DF	ENG	Matt Casey
33	MF	ENG	Ben Close
35	GK	ENG	Alex Bass
36	FW	NIR	Eoin Teggart
38	DF	ENG	Brandon Haunstrup
39	DF	WAL	Harvey Rew
42	DF	ENG	Steve Seddon (on loan from Birmingham City)

== Transfers ==
=== In ===
No.	Pos.	Player	Transferred From	Fee	Date	Source
-	FW	(Northern Ireland) Harry Anderson	(Northern Ireland) Portadown	Undisclosed	28 June 2019	
36	MF	(Northern Ireland) Gerard Storey	(Northern Ireland) Portadown	Undisclosed	28 June 2019	
13	DF	(England) James Bolton	(England) Shrewsbury Town	Free Transfer	1 July 2019	
5	DF	(England) Paul Downing	(England) Blackburn Rovers	Free Transfer	1 July 2019	
22	FW	(Wales) Ellis Harrison	(England) Ipswich Town	Undisclosed	1 July 2019	
7	FW	(India) Ryan Williams	(England) Rotherham United	Free Transfer	1 July 2019	
19	FW	(Wales) Marcus Harness	(England) Burton Albion	Undisclosed	18 July 2019	
10	FW	(England) John Marquis	(England) Doncaster Rovers	Undisclosed	31 July 2019	
18	FW	(Saint Lucia) Reeco Hackett	(England) Bromley	Undisclosed	6 January 2020	
-	GK	(United States) Duncan Turnbull	(United States) Notre Dame Fighting Irish	Undisclosed	12 March 2020	

=== Out ===
No.	Pos.	Player	Transferred to	Fee	Date	Source
5	DF	(England) Matthew Clarke	(England) Brighton & Hove Albion	Undisclosed	1 July 2019	
17	MF	(Wales) Dion Donohue	(England) Mansfield Town	End of Contract	1 July 2019	
39	MF	(England) Freddie Read	(England) Bognor Regis Town	End of Contract	1 July 2019	
34	FW	(England) Dan Smith	(England) Bognor Regis Town	End of Contract	1 July 2019	
20	DF	(England) Nathan Thompson	(England) Peterborough United	End of Contract	1 July 2019	
18	FW	(England) Louis Dennis	(England) Peterborough United	Undisclosed	1 August 2019	
10	FW	(Jamaica) Jamal Lowe	(England) Wigan Athletic	Undisclosed	1 August 2019	
2	DF	(England) Anton Walkes	(United States) Atlanta United	Undisclosed	9 January 2020	
-	GK	(Croatia) Petar Đurin	Free agent	Released	10 February 2020	

=== Loaned in ===
No.	Pos.	Player	Loaned From	Until	Date	Source
20	DF	(England) Sean Raggett	(England) Norwich City	End of Season	27 June 2019	
15	MF	(Scotland) Ross McCrorie	(Scotland) Rangers	End of Season	5 July 2019	
42	DF	(England) Steve Seddon	(England) Birmingham City	End of Season	2 January 2020	
24	MF	(England) Cameron McGeehan	(England) Barnsley	End of Season	7 January 2020	

=== Loaned out ===
No.	Pos.	Player	Loaned to	Until	Date	Source
30	MF	(England) Adam May	(England) Swindon Town	12 January 2020 (Note: On 12 January, May was recalled early by Portsmouth.)	11 June 2019	
21	GK	(England) Luke McGee	(England) Bradford City	End of Season	16 January 2020	
30	MF	(England) Adam May	(England) Boreham Wood	End of Season	11 February 2020	

== Pre-season and friendlies ==
On 3 May 2019 Pompey announced their pre-season schedule. A week later a friendly with Stevenage was added.

10 July 2019 Friendly	UCD	0–11	Portsmouth	Dún Laoghaire–Rathdown, Ireland
19:45 BST		Report	Curtis 10', 39'; Lowe 16'; Dennis 24', 41'; Evans 49'; Pitman 60', 76', 80'; Hancott 78'; Close 84'	Stadium: UCD Bowl; Referee: David Dunne

13 July 2019 Friendly	Havant & Waterlooville	1–2	Portsmouth	Havant
15:00 BST	Deacon 56'	Report	Evans 44' (pen.); Pitman 80'	Stadium: West Leigh Park; Attendance: 3,500; Referee: Matt Russell

16 July 2019 Friendly	Bognor Regis Town	1–2	Portsmouth	Bognor Regis
19:45 BST	Smith 48'	Report	Teggart 21'; Pitman 35'	Stadium: Nyewood Lane; Referee: Dan Austin

20 July 2019 Friendly	Stevenage	0–1	Portsmouth	Stevenage
15:00 BST		Report	Curtis 65'	Stadium: Lamex Stadium; Referee: Will Finnie

23 July 2019 Friendly	Aldershot Town	4–0	Portsmouth XI	Aldershot
19:30 BST	Mullings 80'; Whittingham 85'; Berkeley-Agyepong 89'; Chislett 90+2'	Report		Stadium: Recreation Ground; Attendance: 1,790; Referee: Gary Parsons

27 July 2019 Friendly	Crawley Town	1–2	Portsmouth	Crawley
15:00 BST	Bloomfield 80'	Report	Evans 20'; Naylor 51'	Stadium: The People's Pension Stadium; Attendance: 1,777; Referee: Tim Robinson

30 July 2019 Friendly	Woking	2–4	Portsmouth XI	Woking
19:45 BST	Parry 45'; Diarra 89'	Report	Pitman 3' (pen.), 14'; Hawkins 19', 83'	Stadium: Kingfield Stadium; Attendance: 1,603; Referee: Charles Breakspear

14 June 2020 Friendly	Reading	3–1	Portsmouth	Reading
15:00 BST	Lucas João; Richards; Olise	Report	Hawkins	Stadium: Madejski Stadium; Attendance: 0

21 June 2020 Friendly	Brentford	1–1	Portsmouth	Brentford
15:00 BST	Dervişoğlu 50' (pen.)	Report	Harness 15'	Stadium: Griffin Park; Attendance: 0

== Competitions ==
=== Overall record ===
Competition	Starting round	Final position	Record							
Competition	Starting round	Final position	Pld	W	D	L	GF	GA	GD	Win %
EFL League One	Matchday 1	5th	35	17	9	9	53	36	+17	48.57
FA Cup	First round	Fifth round	5	4	0	1	10	7	+3	80.00
EFL Cup	First round	Third Round	3	2	0	1	5	4	+1	66.67
EFL Trophy	Group stage	Final	8	6	2	0	15	8	+7	75.00
Total			51	29	11	11	83	55	+28	56.86

Last updated: 9 July 2026
Source: Soccerway

=== League One ===
==== League table ====
Pos	Team	Pld	W	D	L	GF	GA	GD	Pts	PPG	Promotion, qualification or relegation
1	Coventry City (C, P)	34	18	13	3	48	30	+18	67	1.97	Promotion to the EFL Championship
2	Rotherham United (P)	35	18	8	9	61	38	+23	62	1.77	Promotion to the EFL Championship
3	Wycombe Wanderers (O, P)	34	17	8	9	45	40	+5	59	1.74	Qualification for League One play-offs (Note: Four teams play for one spot and promotion to the EFL Championship.)
4	Oxford United	35	17	9	9	61	37	+24	60	1.71	Qualification for League One play-offs
5	Portsmouth	35	17	9	9	53	36	+17	60	1.71	Qualification for League One play-offs
6	Fleetwood Town	35	16	12	7	51	38	+13	60	1.71	Qualification for League One play-offs
7	Peterborough United	35	17	8	10	68	40	+28	59	1.69	
8	Sunderland	36	16	11	9	48	32	+16	59	1.64	
9	Doncaster Rovers	34	15	9	10	51	33	+18	54	1.59	

Source: EFL Official Website
Rules for classification: 1) Points per game; 2) Goal difference; 3) Number of goals scored; 4) Head-to-head results; 5) Wins; 6) Away goals; 7) Penalty points (sec 9.5); 8) 12-point sending-off offences
(C) Champions; (O) Play-off winners; (P) Promoted

==== Results summary ====
Overall								Home						Away					
Pld	W	D	L	GF	GA	GD	Pts	W	D	L	GF	GA	GD	W	D	L	GF	GA	GD
35	17	9	9	53	36	+17	60	12	6	0	36	15	+21	5	3	9	17	21	−4

Last updated: 10 March 2020.
Source: BBC

==== Results by matchday ====
Matchday	1	2	3	4	5	6	7	8	9	10	11	12	13	14	15	16	17	18	19	20	21	22	23	24	25	26	27	28	29	30	31	32	33	34	35
Ground	A	H	A	H	A	H	A	H	A	H	A	H	A	H	H	A	H	H	A	H	H	A	A	H	A	A	H	A	A	H	A	H	H	A	H
Result	L	W	L	D	D	D	L	W	W	D	L	W	D	D	W	W	W	D	L	W	W	L	D	W	W	W	W	W	L	W	L	W	W	L	D
Position	18	9	15	14	17	18	20	19	16	16	18	16	16	15	13	11	10	10	10	10	8	9	9	7	7	6	6	5	6	6	7	5	3	6	4

Updated to match(es) played on 10 March 2020. Source: 11v11
A = Away; H = Home; W = Win; D = Draw; L = Loss

==== Matches ====
On Thursday, 20 June 2019, the EFL League One fixtures were revealed.

3 August 2019 1	Shrewsbury Town	1–0	Portsmouth	Shrewsbury
15:00 BST	Ebanks-Landell (yellow card) 58'; Giles 68'; Whalley (yellow card) 74'; Love (yellow card) 90'	Report	Walkes (yellow card) 29'; Evans (yellow card) 31'; Pitman (yellow card) 65'; McCrorie (yellow card) 67' (yellow-red card) 81'	Stadium: Montgomery Waters Meadow; Attendance: 7,880; Referee: Charles Breakspear

10 August 2019 2	Portsmouth	2–0	Tranmere Rovers	Portsmouth
15:00 BST	Close 27'; Naylor (yellow card) 48' (goal) 75'; Downing (yellow card) 90'	Report		Stadium: Fratton Park; Attendance: 18,575; Referee: Scott Oldham

17 August 2019 3	Sunderland	2–1	Portsmouth	Sunderland
12:30 BST	Willis 27'; Maguire 39' (yellow card) 86'; McGeady (yellow card) 79'	Report	Harness 22'; Burgess (yellow card) 76'	Stadium: Stadium of Light; Attendance: 29,140; Referee: Michael Salisbury
Note: Live on Sky Sports

20 August 2019 4	Portsmouth	3–3	Coventry City	Portsmouth
19:45 BST	Curtis 10'; Marquis 43' (yellow card) 88'; Evans 56'; Naylor (yellow card) 85'	Report	Hiwula 3'; Dabo (yellow card) 35' (yellow-red card) 59'; McFadzean (yellow card) 38'; Kastaneer (yellow card) 71' (yellow-red card) 78'; Godden 75' (pen.); Rose 86'	Stadium: Fratton Park; Attendance: 18,748; Referee: Kevin Johnson

24 August 2019	Portsmouth	v	Rotherham United	Portsmouth
15:00 BST				Stadium: Fratton Park
Note: The match was postponed on 18 July 2019 due to safety, operational, logistical and staffing concerns.

31 August 2019 5	Blackpool	1–1	Portsmouth	Blackpool
15:00 BST	Edwards (yellow card) 34'; Gnanduillet 58'; Spearing (yellow card) 73'	Report	Harness 17'; McCrorie (yellow card) 22'; Haunstrup (yellow card) 76'	Stadium: Bloomfield Road; Attendance: 10,605; Referee: Christopher Sarginson

7 September 2019	Portsmouth	v	Southend United	Portsmouth
15:00 BST		Report		Stadium: Fratton Park
Note: The match was postponed on 1 September 2019 due to international selections.

17 September 2019 6	Portsmouth	2–2	Burton Albion	Portsmouth
19:45 BST	Curtis 39'; Downing (yellow card) 90'; Pitman 90+5' (pen.)	Report	Sbarra 3'; Wallace 6'; O'Toole (yellow card) 21' (yellow-red card) 25'; Quinn (yellow card) 90'	Stadium: Fratton Park; Attendance: 16,610; Referee: Craig Hicks

21 September 2019 7	Wycombe Wanderers	1–0	Portsmouth	High Wycombe
15:00 BST	Ofoborh (red card) 54'; Akinfenwa (yellow card) 55' (goal) 82' (pen.)	Report	Harrison (yellow card) 19' (yellow-red card) 57'; Burgess (yellow card) 56'; Pitman (yellow card) 81'	Stadium: Adams Park; Attendance: 7,688; Referee: Seb Stockbridge

28 September 2019 8	Portsmouth	1–0	Bolton Wanderers	Portsmouth
15:00 BST	Curtis (yellow card) 32'; Close (yellow card) 58'; Pitman (penalty missed) 59' 66'	Report	Hobbs (yellow card) 45+1'; Lowe (yellow card) 50'	Stadium: Fratton Park; Attendance: 18,382; Referee: Darren Drysdale

5 October 2019 9	Doncaster Rovers	1–2	Portsmouth	Doncaster
15:00 BST	James 82'	Report	Naylor (yellow card) 27'; Harness (yellow card) 41'; Evans 60'; Harrison 90+1'	Stadium: Keepmoat Stadium; Attendance: 8,962; Referee: Andy Haines

12 October 2019 10	Portsmouth	0–0	Gillingham	Portsmouth
15:00 BST	Brown (yellow card) 32'	Report	Ehmer (yellow card) 36'; O'Keefe (yellow card) 45'; Byrne (yellow card) 58'; Jones (yellow card) 74'; Tucker (yellow card) 85'	Stadium: Fratton Park; Attendance: 18,036; Referee: Graham Salisbury

19 October 2019 11	AFC Wimbledon	1–0	Portsmouth	Norbiton
15:00 BST	Wagstaff (yellow card) 88'; Thomas 90+3'	Report	Brown (yellow card) 35'; Marquis (yellow card) 40'; Raggett (yellow card) 83'	Stadium: The Cherry Red Records Stadium; Attendance: 4,525; Referee: Sam Purkiss

22 October 2019 12	Portsmouth	1–0	Lincoln City	Portsmouth
19:45 BST	Marquis 28'; Raggett (yellow card) 46'; Burgess (yellow card) 75'	Report		Stadium: Fratton Park; Attendance: 17,266

26 October 2019 13	Bristol Rovers	2–2	Portsmouth	Horfield
15:00 BST	Upson (yellow card) 29'; Rodman 78'; Ogogo (yellow card) 83'; MacGillivray 90+3' (o.g.)	Report	Raggett (yellow card) 1'; Evans 9' (pen.); McCrorie (yellow card) 39'; Curtis (yellow card) 69' (goal) 70'; Burgess (yellow card) 80'	Stadium: Memorial Stadium; Attendance: 8,648; Referee: Darren Handley

2 November 2019 14	Portsmouth	1–1	Oxford United	Portsmouth
15:00 GMT	McCrorie (yellow card) 39'; Evans 58' (pen.); Marquis (yellow card) 87'	Report	Mackie (yellow card) 26'; Taylor 90'	Stadium: Fratton Park; Attendance: 18,528; Referee: Ben Toner

5 November 2019 15	Portsmouth	4–1	Southend United	Portsmouth
19:45 GMT	Marquis 45+2' (yellow card) 90+3'; Harrison 50', 80' (pen.); Harness 84'	Report	Goodship 69'; Milligan (yellow card) 90+1'	Stadium: Fratton Park; Attendance: 16,995; Referee: Lee Swabey

16 November 2019	Portsmouth	v	Fleetwood Town	Portsmouth
15:00 GMT		Report		Stadium: Fratton Park
Note: On 7 November, the match was postponed due to international call-ups.

23 November 2019 16	Rochdale	0–3	Portsmouth	Rochdale
15:00 GMT		Report	Curtis 15', 47'; Williams 88'	Stadium: Crown Oil Arena; Attendance: 3,789; Referee: James Adcock

26 November 2019 17	Portsmouth	3–2	Rotherham United	Portsmouth
19:45 GMT	Curtis 1'; Marquis 37'; Harrison (yellow card) 48'; Close 66'	Report	Ladapo 15', 62' (pen.); Ogbene (yellow card) 51'; Morris (yellow card) 89'	Stadium: Fratton Park; Attendance: 16,355; Referee: Antony Coggins

7 December 2019 18	Portsmouth	2–2	Peterborough United	Portsmouth
15:00 GMT	Brown 26' (yellow card) 66'; Harrison 52' (yellow card) 77'; Burgess (yellow card) 53'	Report	Woodyard (yellow card) 2'; Toney 10'; Eisa (yellow card) 44' (goal) 72'; Thompson (yellow card) 68'	Stadium: Fratton Park; Attendance: 17,643; Referee: Charles Breakspear

14 December 2019 19	Accrington Stanley	4–1	Portsmouth	Accrington
15:00 GMT	Harrison 44' (o.g.); Charles 62'; Bishop 69', 77'; Finley (yellow card) 89'	Report	Curtis 35'; McCrorie (yellow card) 78'	Stadium: Wham Stadium; Attendance: 2,429; Referee: Martin Coy

21 December 2019 20	Portsmouth	1–0	Ipswich Town	Portsmouth
15:00 GMT	Harrison (yellow card) 1'; Burgess (yellow card) 32'; Curtis 50'; Williams (yellow card) 84'	Report	Nsiala (yellow card) 7'; Edwards (yellow card) 28'; Chambers (yellow card) 56' (yellow-red card) 88'; Nolan (yellow card) 62'; Woolfenden (yellow card) 88'; Jackson (yellow card) 90+2'	Stadium: Fratton Park; Attendance: 18,801; Referee: Brett Huxtable

26 December 2019 21	Portsmouth	2–0	Wycombe Wanderers	Portsmouth
15:00 GMT	Harrison (yellow card) 13'; Curtis (yellow card) 35' (goal) 73'; Naylor (yellow card) 45+3'; Close 66'	Report	Stewart (yellow card) 53'; Aarons (yellow card) 64'; Jacobson (yellow card) 85'	Stadium: Fratton Park; Attendance: 6,786; Referee: John Busby

29 December 2019 22	Milton Keynes Dons	3–1	Portsmouth	Denbigh
15:00 GMT	McGrandles (yellow card) 26' (goal) 42'; Healey 35'; Brittain (yellow card) 68'; Kasumu (yellow card) 77'; Walsh (yellow card) 83'; Gilbey 84'	Report	Harness (yellow card) 61'; Burgess (yellow card) 84'; Curtis 90+3'	Stadium: Stadium mk Attendance: 12,788; Referee: Leigh Doughty

1 January 2020 23	Gillingham	1–1	Portsmouth	Gillingham
15:00 GMT	O'Keefe (yellow card) 63'; Jakubiak 80'	Report	Evans 36' (yellow card) 38'; Naylor (yellow card) 65'; Raggett (yellow card) 90+6'	Stadium: Priestfield Stadium; Attendance: 5,724; Referee: Alan Young

11 January 2020 24	Portsmouth	2–1	AFC Wimbledon	Portsmouth
15:00 GMT	Harness 20'; Cannon (yellow card) 70'; Marquis 79'	Report	Pigott 62'; Reilly (yellow card) 72'; Wagstaff (yellow card) 74' (yellow-red card) 84'; O'Neill (yellow card) 90+4'	Stadium: Fratton Park; Attendance: 18,417; Referee: Trevor Kettle

18 January 2020 25	Bolton Wanderers	0–1	Portsmouth	Horwich
15:00 GMT	Edwards (yellow card) 24'; Dodoo (yellow card) 30'	Report	Raggett (yellow card) 27'; Burgess 42'; Harrison (yellow card) 45+1'	Stadium: University of Bolton Stadium; Attendance: 13,407; Referee: Tom Nield

25 January 2020	Portsmouth	v	Milton Keynes Dons	Portsmouth
15:00 GMT		Report		Stadium: Fratton Park
Note: Fixture was postponed due to Portsmouth's FA Cup progression.

28 January 2020 26	Lincoln City	0–2	Portsmouth	Lincoln
19:45 GMT	Eardley (yellow card) 25'; Grant (yellow card) 84'; Morrell (yellow card) 90'	Report	Close (yellow card) 39'; Curtis 45+5'; Marquis (yellow card) 58' (goal) 86' (pen.); Naylor (yellow card) 70'	Stadium: Sincil Bank; Attendance: 8,983; Referee: Ben Toner

1 February 2020 27	Portsmouth	2–0	Sunderland	Portsmouth
15:00 GMT	Burgess 25'; Seddon (yellow card) 45+1'; Bolton 52'; Raggett (yellow card) 71'	Report	Gooch (yellow card) 45+1'; Dobson (yellow card) 70'; Semenyo (yellow card) 90+1'	Stadium: Fratton Park; Attendance: 18,531; Referee: Chris Sarginson

8 February 2020 28	Tranmere Rovers	0–2	Portsmouth	Birkenhead
15:00 GMT	Vaughan (yellow card) 31'	Report	Raggett 13'; Williams 51' (yellow card) 77'; Bass (yellow card) 70'	Stadium: Prenton Park; Attendance: 6,985; Referee: Michael Salisbury

11 February 2020 29	Coventry City	1–0	Portsmouth	Bordesley
19:45 GMT	Godden 84'	Report	McGeehan (yellow card) 20'; Close (yellow card) 57'	Stadium: St Andrew's Trillion Trophy Stadium; Attendance: 6,983; Referee: Scott Oldham

15 February 2020 30	Portsmouth	2–0	Shrewsbury Town	Portsmouth
15:00 GMT	Burgess (yellow card) 48'; Harrison 64'; Marquis 82'	Report	Williams (yellow card) 19'; Ebanks-Landell (yellow card) 21'; Lang (yellow card) 86'; Goss (yellow card) 90'	Stadium: Fratton Park; Attendance: 18,214; Referee: Lee Swabey

22 February 2020 31	Fleetwood Town	1–0	Portsmouth	Fleetwood
15:00 GMT	Connolly 12'; Souttar (yellow card) 45+1'; Burns (yellow card) 83'; Coutts (yellow card) 90+3'	Report	Seddon (yellow card) 90+1'	Stadium: Highbury Stadium; Attendance: 3,370; Referee: Matt Donohue

25 February 2020 32	Portsmouth	3–1	Milton Keynes Dons	Portsmouth
19:45 GMT	Cannon 4' (yellow card) 58'; Marquis 49'; Burgess (yellow card) 52'; Harness 90+1'	Report	Gilbey (penalty missed) 45+2' 45+2'; Lewington (yellow card) 68'; Morris (red card) 86'; Poole (yellow card) 89'	Stadium: Fratton Park; Attendance: 16,577; Referee: Kevin Johnson

28 February 2020 33	Portsmouth	3–0	Rochdale	Portsmouth
19:45 GMT	Williams 45'; Burgess (yellow card) 54' (goal) 84'; Seddon 78'	Report	Norrington-Davies (yellow card) 44'; Morley (yellow card) 51'; Camps (yellow card) 59'	Stadium: Fratton Park; Attendance: 17,600; Referee: Nick Kinseley

7 March 2020 34	Peterborough United	2–0	Portsmouth	Peterborough
15:00 GMT	Butler 32'; Brown (yellow card) 41'; Toney 86'	Report	Whatmough (yellow card) 15'; Cannon (yellow card) 79'; Naylor (yellow card) 82'; Raggett (yellow card) 90+3'; Marquis (yellow card) 90+4'	Stadium: Weston Homes Stadium; Attendance: 9,414; Referee: Oliver Yates

10 March 2020 35	Portsmouth	2–2	Fleetwood Town	Portsmouth
19:45 GMT	Raggett 36'; Souttar 48' (o.g.); Curtis (yellow card) 68'; Harrison (yellow card) 90+1'	Report	Whelan (yellow card) 10'; McKay 19' (yellow card) 77'; Gibson (yellow card) 43'; Souttar 55'; Connolly (yellow card) 68'	Stadium: Fratton Park; Attendance: 16,775; Referee: Darren Drysdale

14 March 2020	Portsmouth	v	Accrington Stanley	Portsmouth
15:00 GMT				Stadium: Fratton Park
Note: Season was suspended until 3 April 2020, due to the COVID-19 pandemic.

17 March 2020	Portsmouth	v	Doncaster Rovers	Portsmouth
19:45 GMT				Stadium: Fratton Park
Note: Season was suspended until 3 April 2020, due to the COVID-19 pandemic.

21 March 2020	Ipswich Town	v	Portsmouth	Ipswich
15:00 GMT				Stadium: Portman Road
Note: Season was suspended until 3 April 2020, due to the COVID-19 pandemic.

28 March 2020	Oxford United	v	Portsmouth	Oxford
15:00 GMT				Stadium: Kassam Stadium
Note: Season was suspended until 3 April 2020, due to the COVID-19 pandemic.

4 April 2020	Portsmouth	v	Bristol Rovers	Portsmouth
15:00 GMT				Stadium: Fratton Park
Note: On 3 April, the English Football League decided to postpone all football until safe to do so due to the COVID-19 pandemic.

10 April 2020	Rotherham United	v	Portsmouth	Rotherham
15:00 BST				Stadium: AESSEAL New York Stadium
Note: On 3 April, the English Football League decided to postpone all football until safe to do so due to the COVID-19 pandemic.

13 April 2020	Portsmouth	v	Blackpool	Portsmouth
13:00 BST				Stadium: Fratton Park
Note: On 3 April, the English Football League decided to postpone all football until safe to do so due to the COVID-19 pandemic.

18 April 2020	Southend United	v	Portsmouth	Southend-on-Sea
15:00 BST				Stadium: Roots Hall
Note: On 3 April, the English Football League decided to postpone all football until safe to do so due to the COVID-19 pandemic.

3 May 2020	Burton Albion	v	Portsmouth	Burton upon Trent
15:00 BST				Stadium: Pirelli Stadium
Note: On 3 April, the English Football League decided to postpone all football until safe to do so due to the COVID-19 pandemic.

==== Play-offs ====
3 July 2020 Semi-final first leg	Portsmouth	1–1	Oxford United	Portsmouth
17:30 BST	McGeehan (yellow card) 28'; Curtis 32'	Report	Brannagan (yellow card) 28'; Browne 43'; Rodríguez (yellow card) 87'	Stadium: Fratton Park; Attendance: 0 Referee: Gavin Ward

6 July 2020 Semi-final second leg	Oxford United	1–1 (a.e.t.) (2–2 agg.) (5–4 p)	Portsmouth	Oxford
17:00 BST	Harrison 45+3' (o.g.); Long (yellow card) 58'; Browne (yellow card) 73'; Dickie (yellow card) 91'; Rodríguez (yellow card) 103'; Taylor (yellow card) 107'	Report	Harness 38'; Marquis (yellow card) 64'; Curtis (yellow card) 90+4'	Stadium: Kassam Stadium; Attendance: 0 Referee: Darren England
	Penalties
	Woodburn (penalty scored); Forde (penalty scored); Taylor (penalty scored); Mousinho (penalty scored); Brannagan (penalty scored)		(penalty scored) Marquis; (penalty scored) Evans; (penalty scored) Brown; (penalty missed) McGeehan; (penalty scored) Hawkins

=== FA Cup ===
The first round draw was made on 21 October 2019. The second round draw was made live on 11 November from Chichester City's stadium, Oaklands Park. The third round draw was made live on BBC Two from Etihad Stadium, Micah Richards and Tony Adams conducted the draw. The fourth round draw was made by Alex Scott and David O'Leary on Monday, 6 January. The draw for the fifth round was made on 27 January 2020, live on The One Show.

11 November 2019 First round	Harrogate Town	1–2	Portsmouth	Harrogate
19:45 GMT	Beck 7'	Report	Haunstrup 17'; Curtis 41'	Stadium: CNG Stadium; Attendance: 3,048; Referee: Anthony Backhouse

30 November 2019 Second round	Portsmouth	2–1	Altrincham	Portsmouth
15:00 GMT	Close 56'; Harness (yellow card) 68'; Williams (yellow card) 79'; Pitman 90+4'	Report	Hancock 83' (pen.)	Stadium: Fratton Park; Attendance: 8,539; Referee: Tom Nield

4 January 2020 Third round	Fleetwood Town	1–2	Portsmouth	Fleetwood
15:00 GMT	Evans (yellow card) 45+1'; McAleny 90+1'	Report	Raggett (yellow card) 39'; Bolton 66'; Harness 71'; Walkes (yellow card) 90+3'	Stadium: Highbury Stadium; Attendance: 2,145; Referee: Marc Edwards

25 January 2020 Fourth round	Portsmouth	4–2	Barnsley	Portsmouth
15:00 GMT	Close 37'; Marquis 45+1'; Curtis 62'; Burgess 76'	Report	Woodrow 60'; Chaplin 90+1'	Stadium: Fratton Park; Attendance: 13,286; Referee: Graham Scott

2 March 2020 Fifth round	Portsmouth	0–2	Arsenal	Portsmouth
19:45 GMT	McGeehan (yellow card) 40'	Report	Guendouzi (yellow card) 35'; Papastathopoulos 45+4'; Nketiah 51'	Stadium: Fratton Park; Attendance: 18,839; Referee: Mike Dean

=== EFL Cup ===
The first round draw was made on 20 June. The second round draw was made on 13 August 2019 following the conclusion of all but one first-round matches. The third round draw was confirmed on 28 August 2019, live on Sky Sports.

6 August 2019 First round	Portsmouth	3–0	Birmingham City	Portsmouth
19:45 BST	Harrison 31', 54' (yellow card) 34'; Close 40'	Report	Harding (yellow card) 20'; Bajrami (yellow card) 34'; Agus Medina (yellow card) 41'; Bellingham (yellow card) 75'	Stadium: Fratton Park; Attendance: 9,913; Referee: Neil Hair
Note: Live on Sky Sports

28 August 2019 Second round	Queens Park Rangers	0–2	Portsmouth	Shepherd's Bush
19:45 BST	Manning (yellow card) 40'; Wells (yellow card) 64'; Kelly (yellow card) 77'; Kane (yellow card) 90+5'	Report	Marquis 77' (pen.); Harness 81'; Cannon (yellow card) 90+4'	Stadium: Loftus Road; Attendance: 7,783; Referee: Ross Joyce

24 September 2019 Third round	Portsmouth	0–4	Southampton	Portsmouth
19:45 BST	Hawkins (yellow card) 53'; Pitman (yellow card) 55'	Report	Ings 21', 44'; Bertrand (yellow card) 66'; Cédric 77'; Redmond 86'	Stadium: Fratton Park; Attendance: 18,707; Referee: Kevin Friend
Note: Live on Sky Sports

=== EFL Trophy ===
On 9 July 2019, the pre-determined group stage draw was announced with Invited clubs to be drawn on 12 July 2019. The draw for the second round was made on 16 November 2019 live on Sky Sports. The third round draw was confirmed on 5 December 2019. The semi-final draw was made on Quest by Ian Holloway and Paul Heckingbottom, on 25 January 2020.

Pos	Div	Team	Pld	W	PW	PL	L	GF	GA	GD	Pts	Qualification
1	L1	Portsmouth	3	2	1	0	0	6	3	+3	8	Advance to Round 2
2	L1	Oxford United	3	2	0	1	0	8	4	+4	7	Advance to Round 2
3	ACA	Norwich City U21	3	1	0	0	2	4	6	−2	3	
4	L2	Crawley Town	3	0	0	0	3	2	7	−5	0	

Source: EFL.com

3 September 2019 Group stage	Portsmouth	1–0	Crawley Town	Portsmouth
19:45 BST	Pitman 70'	Report	Allarakhia (yellow card) 28'; Sendles-White (yellow card) 36'	Stadium: Fratton Park; Attendance: 3,784; Referee: James Linington

14 September 2019 Group stage	Portsmouth	3–1	Norwich City U21	Portsmouth
12:30 BST	Harrison 10', 60'; Flint 44'	Report	Milovanovic (yellow card) 37'; Scully 67'	Stadium: Fratton Park; Attendance: 2,855; Referee: Brett Huxtable

8 October 2019 Group stage	Oxford United	2–2 (4–5 p)	Portsmouth	Oxford
19:45 BST	Taylor 21'; Dickie 90+1'; Agyei (yellow card) 90+4'	Report	Rew (yellow card) 19'; Lethbridge 33'; Walkes 85'; Haunstrup (yellow card) 90+1'	Stadium: The Kassam Stadium; Attendance: 1,548; Referee: Will Finnie
	Penalties
	Sole (penalty scored); Brannagan (penalty scored); Hall (penalty scored); Sykes (penalty scored); Ruffels (penalty missed); Agyei (penalty missed); Long (penalty missed)		Evans (penalty scored); Harrison (penalty scored); Close (penalty missed); Williams (penalty scored); Downing (penalty scored); Walkes (penalty missed); Haunstrup (penalty scored)

3 December 2019 Second round	Portsmouth	2–1	Northampton Town	Portsmouth
19:45 GMT	Maloney 39'; Bolton (yellow card) 43'; Harness 62'	Report	Harriman 12' (yellow card) 76'; Martin (yellow card) 43'	Stadium: Fratton Park; Attendance: 2,413; Referee: Will Finnie

7 January 2020 Third round	Walsall	1–2	Portsmouth	Bescot
19:45 GMT	Perry (yellow card) 37'; Adebayo (penalty missed) 45+2'; Lavery 86' (pen.)	Report	Marquis 23'; Hackett-Fairchild (yellow card) 44'; Harrison 82'	Stadium: Banks's Stadium; Attendance: 1,082; Referee: Anthony Backhouse

21 January 2020 Quarter-final	Portsmouth	2–1	Scunthorpe United	Portsmouth
19:45 GMT	Marquis 13'; McGeehan 66'	Report	Eisa 62'	Stadium: Fratton Park; Attendance: 5,382

18 February 2020 Semi-final	Portsmouth	3–2	Exeter City	Portsmouth
19:45 GMT	Harness 86'; McGeehan 90+1'; Marquis 90+6'	Report	Fisher (yellow card) 50'; Warren (yellow card) 59'; Taylor 79'; Burgess 89' (o.g.)	Stadium: Fratton Park; Attendance: 14,735; Referee: Craig Hicks

4 April 2020 Final	Portsmouth	v	Salford City	London
15:00 GMT				Stadium: Wembley Stadium
Note: On 3 April, the English Football League decided to postpone all football until safe to do so due to the COVID-19 pandemic.

== Statistics ==
=== Appearances and goals ===
As of match(es) played 6 July 2020

Players with no appearances are not included on the list
Italics indicate a loaned in player

No.	Pos	Nat	Player	Total		League One (Note: Includes the 2020 EFL play-offs)		FA Cup		EFL Cup		EFL Trophy (Note: Excludes the 2020 EFL Trophy final)	
No.	Pos	Nat	Player	Apps	Goals	Apps	Goals	Apps	Goals	Apps	Goals	Apps	Goals
1	GK	(Scotland) SCO	Craig MacGillivray	27	0	20+0	0	2+0	0	3+0	0	2+0	0
3	DF	(England) ENG	Lee Brown	21	1	18+0	1	2+0	0	1+0	0	0+0	0
4	MF	(England) ENG	Tom Naylor	43	1	33+0	1	3+0	0	3+0	0	2+2	0
5	DF	(England) ENG	Paul Downing	14	0	6+0	0	0+1	0	2+1	0	4+0	0
6	DF	(England) ENG	Christian Burgess	45	4	33+1	3	5+0	1	3+0	0	2+1	0
7	FW	(India) IND	Ryan Williams	36	3	21+7	3	3+1	0	1+0	0	2+1	0
8	FW	(Jersey) JER	Brett Pitman	16	4	4+7	2	0+1	1	1+1	0	1+1	1
9	FW	(England) ENG	Oliver Hawkins	13	0	5+3	0	1+0	0	1+0	0	2+1	0
10	FW	(England) ENG	John Marquis	48	14	25+10	8	4+1	2	2+0	1	3+3	3
11	FW	(Republic of Ireland) IRL	Ronan Curtis	44	14	33+2	12	4+1	2	3+0	0	1+0	0
13	DF	(England) ENG	James Bolton	33	2	21+4	1	3+0	1	1+0	0	4+0	0
14	MF	(England) ENG	Andy Cannon	23	0	13+5	0	1+0	0	1+1	0	2+0	0
15	MF	(Scotland) SCO	Ross McCrorie	27	0	20+0	0	2+0	0	3+0	0	2+0	0
16	DF	(England) ENG	Jack Whatmough	2	0	1+0	0	0+0	0	0+0	0	1+0	0
17	MF	(England) ENG	Bryn Morris	2	0	2+0	0	0+0	0	0+0	0	0+0	0
18	FW	(Saint Lucia) LCA	Reeco Hackett	1	0	0+0	0	0+0	0	0+0	0	1+0	0
19	FW	(Republic of Ireland) IRL	Marcus Harness	37	9	18+9	6	3+1	0	2+0	1	4+0	2
20	DF	(England) ENG	Sean Raggett	38	2	28+0	2	3+0	0	0+1	0	6+0	0
22	FW	(Wales) WAL	Ellis Harrison	39	10	19+11	5	2+1	0	1+0	2	3+2	3
24	MF	(England) ENG	Cameron McGeehan	17	2	12+2	0	1+0	0	0+0	0	2+0	2
25	DF	(England) ENG	Joe Hancott	2	0	0+0	0	0+0	0	0+0	0	2+0	0
26	MF	(England) ENG	Gareth Evans	28	5	10+8	5	2+1	0	1+1	0	4+1	0
28	MF	(England) ENG	Josh Flint	2	1	0+0	0	0+0	0	0+0	0	2+0	1
29	FW	(England) ENG	Leon Maloney	4	1	0+0	0	0+0	0	0+0	0	4+0	1
33	MF	(England) ENG	Ben Close	44	6	27+2	3	4+1	2	3+0	1	4+3	0
35	GK	(England) ENG	Alex Bass	25	0	17+0	0	3+0	0	0+0	0	5+0	0
36	FW	(Northern Ireland) NIR	Eoin Taggart	1	0	0+0	0	0+0	0	0+0	0	1+0	0
37	DF	(Tanzania) TAN	Haji Mnoga	1	0	0+0	0	0+0	0	0+0	0	1+0	0
38	DF	(England) ENG	Brandon Haunstrup	19	1	7+3	0	2+0	1	2+1	0	3+1	0
39	MF	(Wales) WAL	Harvey Rew	1	0	0+0	0	0+0	0	0+0	0	1+0	0
40	FW	(England) ENG	Bradley Lethbridge	1	1	0+0	0	0+0	0	0+0	0	1+0	1
42	DF	(England) ENG	Steve Seddon	18	1	11+2	1	3+0	0	0+0	0	1+1	0
Player(s) who featured but departed permanently during the season:
2	DF	(England) ENG	Anton Walkes	19	1	10+1	0	2+1	0	1+1	0	3+0	1

=== Disciplinary record ===
As of match(es) played 6 July 2020

Players with no cards are not included on the list
Italics indicate a loaned in player

No.	Pos	Nat	Player	Total		League One (Note: Includes the 2020 EFL play-offs)		FA Cup		EFL Cup		EFL Trophy (Note: Excludes the 2020 EFL Trophy final)	
No.	Pos	Nat	Player	Yellow card	Red card	Yellow card	Red card	Yellow card	Red card	Yellow card	Red card	Yellow card	Red card
3	DF	(England) ENG	Lee Brown	3	0	3	0	0	0	0	0	0	0
4	MF	(England) ENG	Tom Naylor	7	0	7	0	0	0	0	0	0	0
5	DF	(England) ENG	Paul Downing	2	0	2	0	0	0	0	0	0	0
6	DF	(England) ENG	Christian Burgess	10	0	10	0	0	0	0	0	0	0
7	FW	(India) IND	Ryan Williams	3	0	2	0	1	0	0	0	0	0
8	FW	(Jersey) JER	Brett Pitman	3	0	2	0	0	0	1	0	0	0
9	FW	(England) ENG	Oliver Hawkins	1	0	0	0	0	0	1	0	0	0
10	FW	(England) ENG	John Marquis	7	0	7	0	0	0	0	0	0	0
11	FW	(Republic of Ireland) IRL	Ronan Curtis	5	0	5	0	0	0	0	0	0	0
13	DF	(England) ENG	James Bolton	1	0	0	0	0	0	0	0	1	0
14	MF	(England) ENG	Andy Cannon	4	0	3	0	0	0	1	0	0	0
15	MF	(Scotland) SCO	Ross McCrorie	6	1	6	1	0	0	0	0	0	0
16	DF	(England) ENG	Jack Whatmough	1	0	1	0	0	0	0	0	0	0
18	FW	(Saint Lucia) LCA	Reeco Hackett	1	0	0	0	0	0	0	0	1	0
19	FW	(Republic of Ireland) IRL	Marcus Harness	3	0	2	0	1	0	0	0	0	0
20	DF	(England) ENG	Sean Raggett	8	0	7	0	1	0	0	0	0	0
22	FW	(Wales) WAL	Ellis Harrison	9	1	8	1	0	0	1	0	0	0
24	MF	(England) ENG	Cameron McGeehan	3	0	2	0	1	0	0	0	0	0
26	MF	(England) ENG	Gareth Evans	2	0	2	0	0	0	0	0	0	0
33	MF	(England) ENG	Ben Close	3	0	3	0	0	0	0	0	0	0
35	GK	(England) ENG	Alex Bass	1	0	1	0	0	0	0	0	0	0
38	DF	(England) ENG	Brandon Haunstrup	2	0	1	0	0	0	0	0	1	0
39	MF	(Wales) WAL	Harvey Rew	1	0	0	0	0	0	0	0	1	0
42	DF	(England) ENG	Steve Seddon	2	0	2	0	0	0	0	0	0	0
Player(s) who were carded but departed permanently during the season:
2	DF	(England) ENG	Anton Walkes	2	0	1	0	1	0	0	0	0	0
Squad Total				90	2	77	2	5	0	4	0	4	0
