= Haji Mnoga =

Tanzanian footballer

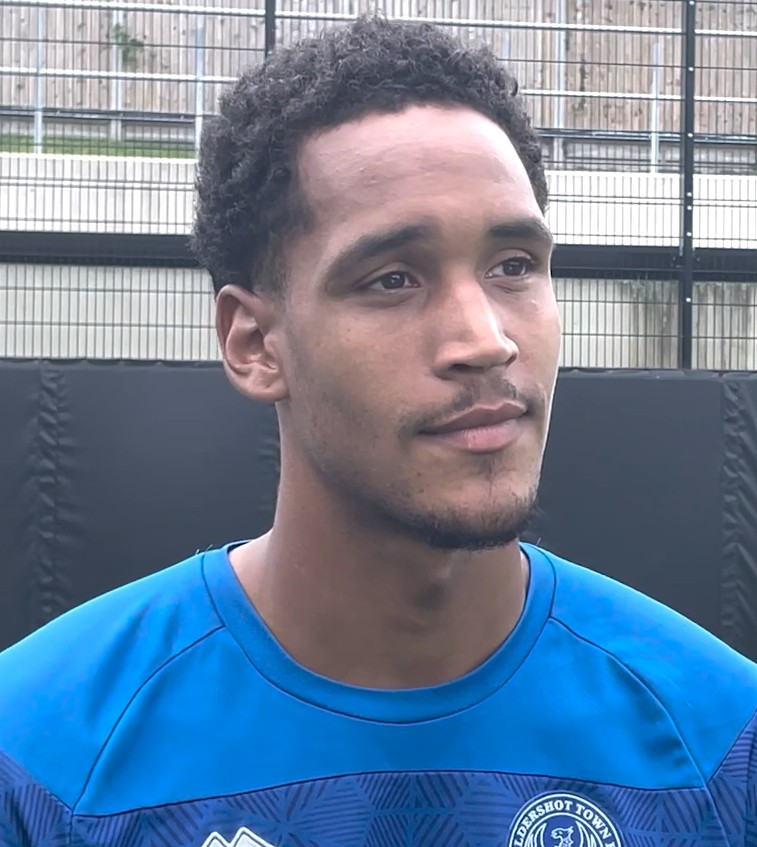
- Mnoga in August 2023

Personal information
- Full name: Haji Suleiman Haji Ali Mnoga
- Date of birth: 16 April 2002 (age 24)
- Place of birth: Portsmouth, England
- Height: 1.85 m (6 ft 1 in)
- Position: Right-back

Team information
- Current team: Patro Eisden
- Number: 22

Youth career
- 2008–2018: Portsmouth

Senior career*
Years	Team	Apps	(Gls)
2018–2024	Portsmouth	5	(0)
2019	→ Bognor Regis Town (loan)	1	(0)
2021	→ Bromley (loan)	6	(0)
2022	→ Weymouth (loan)	19	(0)
2022	→ Gillingham (loan)	4	(0)
2023	→ Aldershot Town (loan)	17	(1)
2023–2024	→ Aldershot Town (loan)	33	(2)
2024–2026	Salford City	64	(1)
2026–	Patro Eisden	5	(0)

International career^{‡}
2019	England U17	1	(0)
2022–	Tanzania	22	(0)
- * Club domestic league appearances and goals as of 20 September 2026 ‡ National team caps and goals as of 29 September 2026

Haji Suleiman Haji Ali Mnoga (born 16 April 2002) is a professional footballer who plays as a right-back for Challenger Pro League club Patro Eisden in Belgium. Born in England, he plays for the Tanzania national team.

== Club career ==
=== Portsmouth ===
Mnoga progressed through Portsmouth's youth categories. He had been at the club since 2008. He was offered a two-year scholarship contract on 28 June 2018.

Mnoga made his professional debut on 9 October 2018, starting in a 1–0 EFL Trophy away win against Crawley Town. At the age of 16 years, five months and 24 days, he became the second-youngest player to debut for the club in their post-war history, only behind fellow Academy teammate Joe Hancott.

On 21 March 2020, Mnoga tested positive for COVID-19.

Having recovered from COVID-19, Mnoga featured for Gosport Borough in a 1–0 pre-season victory over local rivals Havant & Waterlooville at Privett Park in September 2020, having been loaned for the evening by Pompey to their neighbours across the harbour.

On 3 November 2020, Mnoga made his league debut for Portsmouth, coming off the bench to play right-wing in a 3–1 win at Lincoln City. He made his full league debut in a 4–1 home win over Crewe Alexandra, coming off at half-time. He scored his first goal for Portsmouth in an EFL Trophy tie against Cheltenham Town on 8 December 2020.

On 31 August 2021, Mnoga signed a new three-year contract with Portsmouth before moving on loan to National League side Bromley until January 2022.

On 8 January 2022, Mnoga joined National League side Weymouth on loan for the remainder of the 2021–22 season. He joined Gillingham on a season-long loan on deadline day in the summer of 2022, where he was sent off after 10 minutes of his debut. In January 2023, he joined Aldershot Town on loan until the end of the season.

On 2 August 2023, Mnoga returned to Aldershot Town on a season-long loan deal.

On 1 May 2024, Portsmouth said the player would be released in the summer when his contract expired.

=== Salford City ===
Mnoga signed for League Two side Salford City on a one-year deal on 30 August 2024. In May 2025, he had an extension clause in his contract triggered.

On 1 June 2026, it was announced by the club that Mnoga would leave the club on expiry of his contract.

== International career ==
Mnoga was eligible to represent both England and Tanzania at international level. Mnoga made his England U17 debut on 10 February 2019, coming on at half-time against Hungary U17 in a 4–1 penalty friendly win. He debuted with Tanzania national team in a 3–1 friendly win over Central African Republic on 24 March 2022. Mnoga reportedly rejected a call up to the Tanzania Under-23 side in September 2022 to focus on his duties at Gillingham.

In the final match of the 2023 Africa Cup of Nations qualifiers, Tanzania held Algeria to a 0–0 draw, allowing the Taifa Stars to secure their place at the tournament for the third time.

On 2 January 2024, Mnoga was selected by Adel Amrouche to represent the Taifa Stars at the 2023 Africa Cup of Nations. He started all three group-stage matches. Tanzania finished bottom of Group F, with a 3–0 defeat to Morocco and two draws against Zambia and the DR Congo. Despite these results, the Taifa Stars achieved their highest-ever points total at the Africa Cup of Nations.

== Personal life ==
Haji Mnoga was born in Portsmouth to a Tanzanian father and English mother. Mnoga attended Cottage Grove Primary School and Trafalgar School. His father also played football and represented Zanzibar under 17's.

== Career statistics ==
As of end of 2024–25 season

Appearances and goals by club, season and competition
Club	Season	League			FA Cup		League Cup		Other		Total	
Club	Season	Division	Apps	Goals	Apps	Goals	Apps	Goals	Apps	Goals	Apps	Goals
Portsmouth	2018–19	League One	0	0	0	0	0	0	3 (Note: Appearance(s) in EFL Trophy)	0	3	0
Portsmouth	2019–20	League One	0	0	0	0	0	0	1	0	1	0
Portsmouth	2020–21	League One	5	0	1	0	0	0	3	1	9	1
Portsmouth	2021–22	League One	0	0	0	0	0	0	2	0	2	0
Portsmouth	2022–23	League One	0	0	0	0	2	0	1	0	3	0
Portsmouth	2023–24	League One	0	0	0	0	0	0	0	0	0	0
Portsmouth	Total		5	0	1	0	2	0	10	1	18	1
Bognor Regis Town (loan)	2019–20	Isthmian Premier Division	1	0	0	0	—		0	0	1	0
Bromley (loan)	2021–22	National League	6	0	1	0	—		0	0	7	0
Weymouth (loan)	2021–22	National League	19	0	0	0	—		1 (Note: Appearance(s) in FA Trophy)	0	20	0
Gillingham (loan)	2022–23	League Two	4	0	1	0	0	0	0	0	5	0
Aldershot Town (loan)	2022–23	National League	17	1	0	0	—		2	0	19	1
Aldershot Town (loan)	2023–24	National League	33	2	3	0	—		1	0	37	2
Aldershot Town (loan)	Total		50	3	3	0	0	0	3	0	56	3
Salford City	2024–25	League Two	39	1	2	0	0	0	1	0	42	1
Career total			124	4	8	0	2	0	15	1	149	5

== Honours ==
Portsmouth

- EFL Trophy: 2018–19
