= 2018–19 Portsmouth F.C. season =

Portsmouth
2018–19 season
- Chairman: Michael Eisner
- Manager: Kenny Jackett
- Stadium: Fratton Park
- League One: 4th (88 points)
- FA Cup: Fourth round
- EFL Cup: First round
- EFL Trophy: Winners
- Top goalscorer: League: Jamal Lowe (15); All: Jamal Lowe (17)
- Highest home attendance: 19,402 vs. Sunderland (22 December 2018)
- Lowest home attendance: 16,794 vs. Walsall (27 November 2018)
Home colours	Away colours	Third colours

The 2018–19 season was Portsmouth's second season in EFL League One. Along with competing in League One, the club also participated in the FA Cup, EFL Cup and EFL Trophy. The season covered the period from 1 July 2018 to 30 June 2019.

== Players ==
=== Squad ===
As of 31 March 2019

Note: Flags indicate national team as defined under FIFA eligibility rules; some limited exceptions apply. Players may hold more than one non-FIFA nationality.

No.	Pos.	Nation	Player
1	GK	ENG	Luke McGee
2	DF	ENG	Anton Walkes
3	DF	ENG	Lee Brown
5	DF	ENG	Matt Clarke
6	DF	ENG	Christian Burgess
7	MF	ENG	Tom Naylor
8	FW	Jersey	Brett Pitman (captain)
9	FW	ENG	Oliver Hawkins
10	FW	JAM	Jamal Lowe
11	FW	IRL	Ronan Curtis
14	MF	ENG	Andy Cannon
15	GK	SCO	Craig MacGillivray
16	DF	ENG	Jack Whatmough
17	MF	WAL	Dion Donohue

No.	Pos.	Nation	Player
18	FW	ENG	Louis Dennis
19	FW	NGR	Viv Solomon-Otabor (on loan from Birmingham City)
20	DF	ENG	Nathan Thompson
22	FW	ENG	Omar Bogle (on loan from Cardiff City)
24	MF	ENG	Bryn Morris
26	MF	ENG	Gareth Evans
30	MF	ENG	Adam May
31	DF	ENG	Matt Casey
32	FW	ENG	James Vaughan (on loan from Wigan Athletic)
33	MF	ENG	Ben Close
34	FW	ENG	Dan Smith
35	GK	ENG	Alex Bass
37	FW	WAL	Lloyd Isgrove (on loan from Barnsley)
38	DF	ENG	Brandon Haunstrup

== Transfers ==
=== In ===
No.	Pos.	Player	Transferred From	Fee	Date	Source
3	DF	(England) Lee Brown	(England) Bristol Rovers	Free Transfer	1 July 2018	
11	FW	(Republic of Ireland) Ronan Curtis	(Republic of Ireland) Derry City	Undisclosed	1 July 2018	
18	FW	(England) Louis Dennis	(England) Bromley	Free Transfer	1 July 2018	
15	GK	(Scotland) Craig MacGillivray	(England) Shrewsbury Town	Free Transfer	1 July 2018	
7	MF	(England) Tom Naylor	(England) Burton Albion	Free Transfer	1 July 2018	
2	DF	(England) Anton Walkes	(England) Tottenham Hotspur	£200,000	18 July 2018	
-	GK	(Croatia) Petar Đurin	(Italy) Atalanta	Undisclosed	31 July 2018	
-	FW	(Northern Ireland) Eoin Teggart	(Northern Ireland) Cliftonville	Undisclosed	21 September 2018	
14	MF	(England) Andy Cannon	(England) Rochdale	Undisclosed	2 January 2019	
24	MF	(England) Bryn Morris	(England) Shrewsbury Town	Undisclosed	14 January 2019	

=== Out ===
No.	Pos.	Player	Transferred to	Fee	Date	Source
36	MF	(England) Jez Bedford	(England) Poole Town	End of Contract	1 July 2018	
15	FW	(England) Nicke Kabamba	(England) Havant & Waterlooville	End of Contract	1 July 2018	
22	FW	(Scotland) Kal Naismith	(England) Wigan Athletic	End of Contract	1 July 2018	
37	MF	(England) Theo Widdrington	(England) Bristol Rovers	End of Contract	1 July 2018	
32	MF	(England) Christian Oxlade-Chamberlain	(England) Notts County	End of Contract	1 August 2018	
19	FW	(England) Conor Chaplin	(England) Coventry City	Undisclosed	4 January 2019	
4	MF	(England) Danny Rose	(England) Swindon Town	Undisclosed	17 January 2019	

=== Loaned in ===
No.	Pos.	Player	Loaned From	Until	Date	Source
22	FW	(England) David Wheeler	(England) Queens Park Rangers	24 January 2019 (Note: On 24 January, Wheeler was recalled early by his parent club Queens Park Rangers.)	7 August 2018	
32	MF	(England) Ben Thompson	(England) Millwall	8 January 2019 (Note: On 8 January, Thompson was recalled early by his parent club Millwall.)	17 August 2018	
37	FW	(England) Andre Green	(England) Aston Villa	17 January 2019 (Note: On 17 January, Green was recalled early by his parent club Aston Villa.)	20 August 2018	
14	FW	(Republic of Ireland) Joe Mason	(England) Wolves	2 January 2019	31 August 2018	
22	FW	(England) Omar Bogle	(Wales) Cardiff City	End of Season	28 January 2019	
37	FW	(Wales) Lloyd Isgrove	(England) Barnsley	End of Season	30 January 2019	
19	FW	(Nigeria) Viv Solomon-Otabor	(England) Birmingham City	End of Season	31 January 2019	
32	FW	(England) James Vaughan	(England) Wigan Athletic	End of Season	31 January 2019	

=== Loaned out ===
No.	Pos.	Player	Loaned to	Until	Date	Source
35	GK	(England) Alex Bass	(England) Torquay United	13 December 2018 (Note: On 13 December, Bass was recalled early by Portsmouth.)	9 July 2018	
40	FW	(England) Bradley Lethbridge	(England) Bognor Regis Town	End of Season	25 July 2018	
34	FW	(England) Dan Smith	(England) Bognor Regis Town	1 January 2019	25 July 2018	
19	FW	(England) Conor Chaplin	(England) Coventry City	4 January 2019	30 August 2018	
30	MF	(England) Adam May	(England) Aldershot Town	5 December 2018	20 September 2018	
-	DF	(England) Joe Dandy	(England) Bognor Regis Town	1 December 2018	10 October 2018	
29	MF	(England) Leon Maloney	(England) Bognor Regis Town	1 January 2019	13 November 2018	
39	MF	(England) Freddie Read	(England) Bognor Regis Town	1 January 2019	13 November 2018	
34	FW	(England) Dan Smith	(Republic of Ireland) Cork City	End of Season	21 February 2019	
29	MF	(England) Leon Maloney	(England) Bognor Regis Town	End of Season	22 February 2019	
25	DF	(England) Joe Hancott	(England) Basingstoke Town	End of Season	2 March 2019	
23	GK	(Croatia) Petar Đurin	(England) Bognor Regis Town	End of Season	16 March 2019	

== Pre-season and friendlies ==
Portsmouth announced they will face Cork City, Havant & Waterlooville, Stevenage, Swindon Town and FC Utrecht as part of the pre-season preparations.

2 July 2018 Friendly	Cork City	1–4	Portsmouth	Cork, Ireland
19:00 BST	O'Hanlon 53'	Report	Burgess 23'; Lowe 28'; Chaplin 58', 76'	Stadium: Turner's Cross; Attendance: 965; Referee: Graham Kelly

7 July 2018 Friendly	Havant & Waterlooville	1–2	Portsmouth	Havant
15:00 BST	Pavey 30' (pen.)	Report	Thompson 34'; Chaplin 84'	Stadium: West Leigh Park; Referee: Dean Treleaven

14 July 2018 Friendly	Stevenage	3–2	Portsmouth	Stevenage
15:00 BST	Kennedy 30'; Georgiou 57', 70'	Report	Evans 20'; Chaplin 89'	Stadium: Broadhall Way

17 July 2018 Friendly	Gosport Borough	0–3	Portsmouth	Gosport
19:30 BST		Report	Dennis 63', 67'; Johnston 87'	Stadium: Privett Park; Attendance: 1,010

21 July 2018 Friendly	Swindon Town	0–2	Portsmouth	Swindon
15:00 BST		Report	Hawkins 58'; Lowe 72'	Stadium: County Ground; Referee: Dean Whitestone

24 July 2018 Friendly	Bognor Regis Town	1–5	Portsmouth	Bognor Regis
19:45 BST	Muitt 19'	Report	May 3', 32', 48'; Maloney 43'; Smith 84'	Stadium: Nyewood Lane; Attendance: 1,240; Referee: Daniel Austin

28 July 2018 Friendly	Portsmouth	1–1	FC Utrecht	Portsmouth
13:00 BST	Walkes 44'	Report	Klaiber 15'	Stadium: Fratton Park; Attendance: 4,299; Referee: Andy Davies

== Competitions ==
=== Overall record ===
Competition	Starting round	Final position	Record							
Competition	Starting round	Final position	Pld	W	D	L	GF	GA	GD	Win %
EFL League One	Matchday 1	4th	46	25	13	8	83	51	+32	54.35
FA Cup	First round	Fourth round	5	3	1	1	7	3	+4	60.00
EFL Cup	First round	First round	1	0	0	1	1	2	−1	0.00
EFL Trophy	Group stage	Winners	8	7	1	0	18	4	+14	87.50
Total			60	35	15	10	109	60	+49	58.33

Last updated: 25 July 2026
Source: Soccerway

=== League One ===
==== League table ====
Pos	Team	Pld	W	D	L	GF	GA	GD	Pts	Promotion, qualification or relegation
2	Barnsley (P)	46	26	13	7	80	39	+41	91	Promotion to the EFL Championship
3	Charlton Athletic (O, P)	46	26	10	10	73	40	+33	88	Qualification for League One play-offs (Note: Four teams play for one spot and promotion to the EFL Championship.)
4	Portsmouth	46	25	13	8	83	51	+32	88	Qualification for League One play-offs
5	Sunderland	46	22	19	5	80	47	+33	85	Qualification for League One play-offs
6	Doncaster Rovers	46	20	13	13	76	58	+18	73	Qualification for League One play-offs

Source: EFL Official Website
Rules for classification: 1) Points; 2) Goal difference; 3) Number of goals scored; 4) Head-to-head results
(O) Play-off winners; (P) Promoted

==== Results summary ====
Overall								Home						Away					
Pld	W	D	L	GF	GA	GD	Pts	W	D	L	GF	GA	GD	W	D	L	GF	GA	GD
46	25	13	8	83	51	+32	88	12	7	4	42	22	+20	13	6	4	41	29	+12

Last updated: 4 May 2019.
Source: BBC

==== Results by matchday ====
Matchday	1	2	3	4	5	6	7	8	9	10	11	12	13	14	15	16	17	18	19	20	21	22	23	24	25	26	27	28	29	30	31	32	33	34	35	36	37	38	39	40	41	42	43	44	45	46
Ground	H	A	H	A	A	H	H	A	H	A	A	H	A	H	H	A	A	A	H	H	H	A	H	A	A	H	H	A	A	H	A	A	H	H	H	A	A	H	A	A	H	A	H	A	H	H
Result	W	W	W	W	D	W	D	W	D	W	W	L	W	W	D	D	W	W	W	W	L	D	W	L	W	W	L	L	L	D	D	D	D	D	W	L	W	W	W	W	W	W	W	D	L	D
Position	9	5	2	2	3	2	2	1	2	1	1	1	1	1	1	1	1	1	1	1	1	1	1	1	1	1	1	1	2	3	3	3	4	4	4	4	4	4	3	4	4	4	3	3	3	4

Updated to match(es) played on 4 May 2019. Source: 11v11
A = Away; H = Home; W = Win; D = Draw; L = Loss

==== Matches ====
On 21 June 2018, the League One fixtures for the forthcoming season were announced.

4 August 2018 1	Portsmouth	1–0	Luton Town	Portsmouth
15:00 BST	Lowe 16'	Report		Stadium: Fratton Park; Attendance: 19,018; Referee: Gavin Ward

11 August 2018 2	Blackpool	1–2	Portsmouth	Blackpool
15:00 BST	Clarke 81' (o.g.)	Report	Curtis 9', 59'	Stadium: Bloomfield Road; Attendance: 4,154; Referee: Ross Joyce

18 August 2018 3	Portsmouth	4–1	Oxford United	Portsmouth
15:00 BST	Evans 48'; Dickie 56' (o.g.); Lowe 65', 90+2'	Report	Whatmough 89' (o.g.)	Stadium: Fratton Park; Attendance: 18,093; Referee: Lee Swabey

21 August 2018 4	Bristol Rovers	1–2	Portsmouth	Horfield
19:45 BST	Lines 76' (pen.) (red card) 78'	Report	Evans 32'; Curtis 87'	Stadium: The Memorial Stadium; Attendance: 9,073; Referee: Graham Salisbury

25 August 2018 5	Doncaster Rovers	0–0	Portsmouth	Doncaster
15:00 BST	Maroši (red card) 83'	Report		Stadium: Keepmoat Stadium; Attendance: 7,618; Referee: Andy Haines

1 September 2018 6	Portsmouth	3–0	Plymouth Argyle	Portsmouth
15:00 BST	Curtis 22', 69'; Lowe 63'	Report		Stadium: Fratton Park; Attendance: 18,872; Referee: Tom Nield

8 September 2018 7	Portsmouth	1–1	Shrewsbury Town	Portsmouth
15:00 BST	Pitman 87' (pen.)	Report	Docherty 74'	Stadium: Fratton Park; Attendance: 17,634; Referee: Charles Breakspear

15 September 2018 8	Peterborough United	1–2	Portsmouth	Peterborough
15:00 BST	Godden 90+4'	Report	Hawkins 62'; Lowe 75'	Stadium: London Road Stadium; Attendance: 10,472; Referee: Roger East

22 September 2018 9	Portsmouth	2–2	Wycombe Wanderers	Portsmouth
15:00 BST	Evans 57'; Pitman 86'	Report	Morris 21'; Jacobson 89' (pen.)	Stadium: Fratton Park; Attendance: 18,648; Referee: Craig Hicks

29 September 2018 10	Rochdale	1–3	Portsmouth	Rochdale
15:00 BST	Wilbraham 4'	Report	Lowe 25'; Pitman 71'; Clarke 81'	Stadium: Spotland Stadium; Attendance: 3,796; Referee: John Busby

2 October 2018 11	Coventry City	0–1	Portsmouth	Coventry
19:45 BST		Report	Curtis 45+2'	Stadium: Ricoh Arena; Attendance: 11,102; Referee: Brett Huxtable

6 October 2018 12	Portsmouth	0–2	Gillingham	Portsmouth
15:00 BST		Report	Eaves 26'; Lacey 45+2'	Stadium: Fratton Park; Attendance: 18,158; Referee: Chris Sarginson

13 October 2018 13	AFC Wimbledon	1–2	Portsmouth	Norbiton
15:00 BST	Soares (yellow card) 49'; Hanson 63'	Report	Naylor 24'; Evans 31'; Donohue (yellow card) 38'; Whatmough (yellow card) 40'	Stadium: Kingsmeadow; Attendance: 4,569; Referee: Lee Probert

20 October 2018 14	Portsmouth	1–0	Fleetwood Town	Portsmouth
15:00 BST	Hawkins 50'; Naylor (yellow card) 66'	Report	Coyle (yellow card) 29'; Wallace (yellow card) 64'; Sheron (yellow card) 78', (yellow card) 84' (red card)	Stadium: Fratton Park; Attendance: 18,046; Referee: Lee Swabey

23 October 2018 15	Portsmouth	2–2	Burton Albion	Portsmouth
19:45 BST	Hawkins 36'; Clarke 57'	Report	Cole 48'; Hesketh 52'	Stadium: Fratton Park; Attendance: 18,200; Referee: Andrew Madley

27 October 2018 16	Accrington Stanley	1–1	Portsmouth	Accrington
15:00 BST	McConville (yellow card) 50'; Ihiekwe 64'	Report	Thompson (yellow card) 47'; Hawkins 62'	Stadium: Crown Ground; Attendance: 3,558; Referee: Steve Martin

3 November 2018 17	Bradford City	0–1	Portsmouth	Bradford
15:00 GMT	Chicksen (yellow card) 57' (yellow-red card) 83'; McGowan (yellow card) 53'	Report	Evans 12'; Whatmough (yellow card) 84'	Stadium: Valley Parade; Attendance: 16,393; Referee: Geoff Eltringham

24 November 2018 18	Scunthorpe United	1–2	Portsmouth	Scunthorpe
15:00 GMT	Novak 60'	Report	Naylor 34'; Evans 40'	Stadium: Glanford Park; Attendance: 4,365; Referee: Martin Coy

27 November 2018 19	Portsmouth	2–0	Walsall	Portsmouth
19:45 GMT	Hawkins 25'; Curtis 49'	Report		Stadium: Fratton Park; Attendance: 16,794; Referee: Alan Young

8 December 2018 20	Portsmouth	2–0	Southend United	Portsmouth
15:00 GMT	Turner 11' (o.g.); Lowe 29'	Report		Stadium: Fratton Park; Attendance: 18,062; Referee: Lee Collins

11 December 2018 21	Portsmouth	1–2	Charlton Athletic	Portsmouth
19:45 GMT	Green 88'; Thompson (red card) 90+5'	Report	Ahearne-Grant 23'; Ajose 43'	Stadium: Fratton Park; Attendance: 17,891; Referee: John Brooks

15 December 2018 22	Barnsley	1–1	Portsmouth	Barnsley
15:00 GMT	Woodrow 61'	Report	Evans 43'	Stadium: Oakwell; Attendance: 12,441; Referee: Jonathan Moss

22 December 2018 23	Portsmouth	3–1	Sunderland	Portsmouth
15:00 GMT	Hawkins (yellow card) 27'; Evans 48' (pen.); Curtis (yellow card) 52' (goal) 53'; N. Thompson (yellow card) 60'; B. Thompson 63'	Report	Loovens (red card) 47'; Honeyman (yellow card) 54'; O'Nien 57'	Stadium: Fratton Park; Attendance: 19,402; Referee: Peter Bankes

26 December 2018 24	Gillingham	2–0	Portsmouth	Gillingham
13:00 GMT	Byrne (yellow card) 20'; Parker 45'; Fuller (yellow card) 60'; Reilly 90+1' (pen.)	Report	Whatmough (yellow card) 90+1'	Stadium: Priestfield Stadium; Attendance: 6,940; Referee: Nick Kinseley

29 December 2018 25	Fleetwood Town	2–5	Portsmouth	Fleetwood
15:00 GMT	Marney (yellow card) 33' (yellow-red card) 51'; Madden 39' (yellow card) 41'; Evans 43' (pen.)	Report	Thompson 26'; Clarke (yellow card) 43'; Pitman 57' (pen.); Walkes 58'; Lowe 81', 84'	Stadium: Highbury Stadium; Attendance: 3,494; Referee: Matt Donohue

1 January 2019 26	Portsmouth	2–1	AFC Wimbledon	Portsmouth
15:00 GMT	Lowe 8'; Curtis (yellow card) 80' (goal) 80'	Report	Wordsworth (yellow card) 55'; Appiah 75'	Stadium: Fratton Park; Attendance: 18,732; Referee: Antony Coggins

12 January 2019 27	Portsmouth	0–1	Blackpool	Portsmouth
15:00 GMT		Report	Long 74'	Stadium: Fratton Park; Attendance: 18,403; Referee: Kevin Johnson

19 January 2019 28	Oxford United	2–1	Portsmouth	Oxford
15:00 GMT	Brannagan 25'; Henry 45' (yellow card) 90+1'	Report	Lowe (yellow card) 37'; Pitman 64'; Whatmough (yellow card) 88'; Naylor (yellow card) 90+5'	Stadium: Kassam Stadium; Attendance: 8,202; Referee: Chris Sarginson

29 January 2019 29	Luton Town	3–2	Portsmouth	Luton
19:45 GMT		Report		Stadium: Kenilworth Road; Attendance: 10,078; Referee: Simon Hooper

2 February 2019 30	Portsmouth	1–1	Doncaster Rovers	Portsmouth
15:00 GMT	Thompson (yellow card) 7'; Bogle 54'; Lowe (yellow card) 56'; Burgess (yellow card) 65'; Naylor (yellow card) 88'	Report	Wilks 30'; Lewis (yellow card) 42'	Stadium: Fratton Park; Attendance: 17,800; Referee: Alan Young

9 February 2019 31	Plymouth Argyle	1–1	Portsmouth	Plymouth
15:00 GMT	Carey 70'	Report	Close 56'; Evans (yellow card) 59'; Thompson (yellow card) 73'; Curtis (yellow card) 78'	Stadium: Home Park; Attendance: 12,052; Referee: Ben Toner

16 February 2019 32	Southend United	3–3	Portsmouth	Southend-on-Sea
12:30 GMT	Cox 36', 78' (pen.), 87'; Klass (yellow card) 83'; Moore (yellow card) 90+3'	Report	Morris 8'; Close 20'; Hawkins 31'; Walkes (yellow card) 90+3'; Vaughan (yellow card) 90+3'	Stadium: Roots Hall; Attendance: 7,300; Referee: Dean Whitestone

19 February 2019 33	Portsmouth	1-1	Bristol Rovers	Portsmouth
19:45 GMT		Report		Stadium: Fratton Park; Referee: Neil Hair

23 February 2019 34	Portsmouth	0–0	Barnsley	Portsmouth
15:00 GMT	Bogle (penalty missed) 61'; Clarke (yellow card) 70'	Report	McGeehan (yellow card) 31'	Stadium: Fratton Park; Attendance: 18,624; Referee: Charles Breakspear

2 March 2019 35	Portsmouth	5–1	Bradford City	Portsmouth
15:00 GMT	Evans 23' (pen.); Naylor 41'; Lowe 67'; Close 70', 87'	Report	Caddis (yellow card) 45+1'; Akpan 65'; Knight-Percival (yellow card) 73'	Stadium: Fratton Park; Attendance: 17,657; Referee: Oliver Langford

9 March 2019 36	Charlton Athletic	2–1	Portsmouth	Charlton
17:30 GMT	Aribo 41'; Taylor 51'	Report	Curtis 45+1'; Hawkins (yellow card) 52'; Burgess (yellow card) 69'; Clarke (yellow card) 90+2'	Stadium: The Valley; Attendance: 14,451; Referee: Roger East

12 March 2019 37	Walsall	2–3	Portsmouth	Walsall
19:45 GMT	Kinsella (yellow card) 37'; Gordon (yellow card) 72'; Guthrie 75', 90+4'; Ferrier (yellow card) 76'	Report	Pitman 13' (pen.); Clarke (yellow card) 16'; Bogle 25'; Solomon-Otabor 68'	Stadium: Bescot Stadium; Attendance: 4,097; Referee: Trevor Kettle

16 March 2019 38	Portsmouth	2–0	Scunthorpe United	Portsmouth
15:00 GMT	Bogle 71'; Lowe 87'; Evans (yellow card) 90+2'	Report	Perch (yellow card) 64'	Stadium: Fratton Park; Attendance: 17,308; Referee: Peter Wright

23 March 2019 39	Shrewsbury Town	0–2	Portsmouth	Shrewsbury
15:00 GMT	Grant (yellow card) 75'	Report	Close 40' (yellow card) 68'; Bogle (yellow card) 52'; Naylor (yellow card) 57'; Burgess (yellow card) 76'; Pitman 79'; Brown (yellow card) 81'	Stadium: New Meadow; Attendance: 8,028; Referee: Oliver Yates

6 April 2019 40	Wycombe Wanderers	2–3	Portsmouth	High Wycombe
15:00 BST	Bean 55'; Kashket 82'	Report	Lowe 17'; Clarke (yellow card) 45+1'; Pitman 46', 60'	Stadium: Adams Park; Attendance: 6,978; Referee: John Busby

13 April 2019 41	Portsmouth	4–1	Rochdale	Portsmouth
15:00 BST	Hawkins 21'; Pitman 45+1' (pen.); Evans 62'; Lowe 79'	Report	Wilbraham (yellow card) 38' (goal) 54'; Ebanks-Landell (yellow card) 45'; Bunney (yellow card) 52'	Stadium: Fratton Park; Attendance: 18,197; Referee: Lee Swabey

19 April 2019 42	Burton Albion	1–2	Portsmouth	Burton upon Trent
15:00 BST	Boyce 47'; McFadzean (yellow card) 88'	Report	Close 31' (yellow card) 44'; Clarke 90+2'; Bogle (yellow card) 90+4'	Stadium: Pirelli Stadium; Attendance: 4,034; Referee: Craig Hicks

22 April 2019 43	Portsmouth	2–1	Coventry City	Portsmouth
12:30 BST	Naylor 66'; Pitman 83'	Report	Hiwula 9'; Burge (yellow card) 57'	Stadium: Fratton Park; Attendance: 18,884; Referee: Darren Drysdale

27 April 2019 44	Sunderland	1–1	Portsmouth	Sunderland
15:00 BST	Flanagan 9'	Report	Lowe 24'	Stadium: Stadium of Light; Attendance: 41,129; Referee: Craig Pawson

30 April 2019 45	Portsmouth	2–3	Peterborough United	Portsmouth
19:45 BST	Close 38'; Brown (yellow card) 58'; Burgess 59'; Lowe (yellow card) 88'	Report	Tomlin 13' (yellow card) 32'; Toney 27', 75'; Ward (yellow card) 36'; Maddison (yellow card) 58'; Woodyard (yellow card) 65'	Stadium: Fratton Park; Attendance: 18,396; Referee: Dean Whitestone

4 May 2019 46	Portsmouth	1–1	Accrington Stanley	Portsmouth
17:30 BST	Close 59'	Report	McConville 46'	Stadium: Fratton Park; Attendance: 18,439; Referee: Scott Duncan

==== Play-offs ====
11 May 2019 Semi-final first leg	Sunderland	1–0	Portsmouth	Sunderland
19:30 BST	Maguire 62'Honeyman (yellow card) 82'	Report		Stadium: Stadium of Light; Attendance: 26,610; Referee: Andy Woolmer

16 May 2019 Semi-final second leg	Portsmouth	0–0 (0–1 agg.)	Sunderland	Portsmouth
19:45 BST	Evans (yellow card) 4'; Naylor (yellow card) 11'; Pitman (yellow card) 45+3'; Vaughan (yellow card) 79'	Report	Maguire (yellow card) 21'; O'Nien (yellow card) 75'	Stadium: Fratton Park; Attendance: 18,077; Referee: Peter Bankes

=== FA Cup ===
The first round draw was made live on BBC by Dennis Wise and Dion Dublin on 22 October. The draw for the second round was made live on BBC and BT by Mark Schwarzer and Glenn Murray on 12 November. The third round draw was made live on BBC by Ruud Gullit and Paul Ince from Stamford Bridge on 3 December 2018. The fourth round draw was made live on BBC by Robbie Keane and Carl Ikeme from Wolverhampton on 7 January 2019.

10 November 2018 First round	Maidenhead United	0–4	Portsmouth	Maidenhead
12:30 GMT		Report	Thompson 43'; Hawkins 55'; Lowe 60'; Wheeler 83'	Stadium: York Road; Attendance: 3,205; Referee: Dean Whitestone

2 December 2018 Second round	Rochdale	0–1	Portsmouth	Rochdale
14:00 GMT		Report	Green 90'	Stadium: Spotland Stadium; Attendance: 2,555; Referee: Sebastian Stockbridge

5 January 2019 Third round	Norwich City	0–1	Portsmouth	Norwich
17:30 GMT	Hanley (red card) 15'	Report	Lowe (yellow card) 55'; Curtis (yellow card) 71'; Green 90+4'	Stadium: Carrow Road; Attendance: 23,201; Referee: Darren Bond

26 January 2019 Fourth round	Portsmouth	1–1	Queens Park Rangers	Portsmouth
15:00 GMT	Whatmough (yellow card) 27'; Brown 63', (yellow card) 77'; Curtis (yellow card) 77'	Report	Manning (yellow card) 45'; Wells 74'; Lynch (yellow card) 78'	Stadium: Fratton Park; Attendance: 19,378; Referee: Gavin Ward

5 February 2019 Fourth round replay	Queens Park Rangers	2–0	Portsmouth	Shepherd's Bush
19:45 GMT	Scowen (yellow card) 52'; Wells 70'; Smith 77'	Report	Burgess (yellow card) 76'	Stadium: Loftus Road; Attendance: 13,115; Referee: David Coote

=== EFL Cup ===
On 15 June 2018, the draw for the first round was made in Vietnam.

14 August 2018 First round	Portsmouth	1–2	AFC Wimbledon	Portsmouth
19:45 BST	Burgess 49'	Report	Pigott 76'; Walkes 88' (o.g.)	Stadium: Fratton Park; Attendance: 6,588; Referee: Ollie Yates

=== EFL Trophy ===
On 13 July 2018, the initial group stage draw bar the U21 invited clubs was announced. The draw for the second round was made live on Talksport by Leon Britton and Steve Claridge on 16 November. On 8 December, the third round draw was drawn by Alan McInally and Matt Le Tissier on Soccer Saturday. The Quarter-final draw was made conducted on Sky Sports by Don Goodman and Thomas Frank on 10 January 2019. The draw for the semi-finals took place on 25 January live on Talksport.

Pos	Lge	Team	Pld	W	PW	PL	L	GF	GA	GD	Pts	Qualification
1	L1	Portsmouth	3	3	0	0	0	8	2	+6	9	Round 2
2	ACA	Tottenham Hotspur U21	3	1	0	1	1	7	4	+3	4	Round 2
3	L1	Gillingham	3	1	0	0	2	2	9	−7	3	
4	L2	Crawley Town	3	0	1	0	2	2	4	−2	2	

Source: EFL.com

4 September 2018 Group stages	Portsmouth	4–0	Gillingham	Portsmouth
19:45 BST	Clarke 41'; Close 43'; Pitman 55' (pen.); Wheeler 90+1'	Report		Stadium: Fratton Park; Attendance: 2,011; Referee: Alan Young

9 October 2018 Group stages	Crawley Town	0–1	Portsmouth	Crawley
19:45 BST		Report	Donohue 37'	Stadium: Broadfield Stadium; Attendance: 1,268

13 November 2018 Group stages	Portsmouth	3–2	Tottenham Hotspur U21	Portsmouth
19:45 GMT	Green 50'; Evans 69'	Report	Patterson 20'; White 90'	Stadium: Fratton Park; Attendance: 3,138

4 December 2018 Second round	Portsmouth	2–1	Arsenal U21	Portsmouth
19:45 GMT	Pitman 10'; Green 83'	Report	Saka 66'	Stadium: Fratton Park; Attendance: 3,109

8 January 2019 Third round	Southend United	0–2	Portsmouth	Southend-on-Sea
19:45 GMT		Report	Dennis 6'; Evans 45+2'	Stadium: Roots Hall; Attendance: 1,649; Referee: Craig Hicks

22 January 2019 Quarter-final	Portsmouth	1–0	Peterborough United	Portsmouth
19:00 GMT	Close (yellow card) 74'; Wheeler 85'	Report		Stadium: Fratton Park; Attendance: 3,313

26 February 2019 Semi-final	Bury	0–3	Portsmouth	Bury
19:45 GMT		Report	Evans 61' (yellow card) 62'; Hawkins 64'; Curtis 77'	Stadium: Gigg Lane; Attendance: 3,900; Referee: Ross Joyce

31 March 2019 Final	Portsmouth	2–2 (a.e.t.) (5–4 p)	Sunderland	London
14:30 GMT	Curtis (yellow card) 32'; Thompson 82'; Evans (yellow card) 101'; Lowe 114' (yellow card) 116'	Report	McGeady 38', 119' (yellow card) 90'; Baldwin (yellow card) 80'	Stadium: Wembley Stadium; Attendance: 85,021; Referee: Dean Whitestone
	Penalties
	Evans (penalty scored); Pitman (penalty scored); Brown (penalty scored); Lowe (penalty scored); Hawkins (penalty scored)		McGeady (penalty scored); Cattermole (penalty missed); Gooch (penalty scored); Power (penalty scored); O'Nien (penalty scored)

== Statistics ==
=== Appearances and goals ===
As of match(es) played 16 May 2019

Players with no appearances are not included on the list
Italics indicate a loaned in player

No.	Pos	Nat	Player	Total		League One (Note: Includes the 2019 EFL play-offs)		FA Cup		EFL Cup		EFL Trophy	
No.	Pos	Nat	Player	Apps	Goals	Apps	Goals	Apps	Goals	Apps	Goals	Apps	Goals
1	GK	(England) ENG	Luke McGee	5	0	0+0	0	0+0	0	1+0	0	4+0	0
2	DF	(England) ENG	Anton Walkes	35	1	18+7	1	3+0	0	1+0	0	3+3	0
3	DF	(England) ENG	Lee Brown	51	1	45+0	0	4+0	1	0+0	0	2+0	0
5	DF	(England) ENG	Matt Clarke	60	4	48+0	3	5+0	0	1+0	0	3+3	1
6	DF	(England) ENG	Christian Burgess	38	2	22+5	1	1+1	0	1+0	1	8+0	0
7	MF	(England) ENG	Tom Naylor	53	4	45+0	4	4+0	0	1+0	0	2+1	0
8	FW	(Jersey) JER	Brett Pitman	42	13	17+16	11	2+3	0	1+0	0	3+0	2
9	FW	(England) ENG	Oliver Hawkins	48	10	32+9	7	3+0	1	0+1	0	1+2	2
10	FW	(Jamaica) JAM	Jamal Lowe	55	17	45+2	15	4+0	1	1+0	0	2+1	1
11	FW	(Republic of Ireland) IRL	Ronan Curtis	49	12	37+5	11	4+0	0	0+1	0	2+0	1
14	MF	(England) ENG	Andy Cannon	2	0	1+1	0	0+0	0	0+0	0	0+0	0
15	GK	(Scotland) SCO	Craig MacGillivray	56	0	48+0	0	5+0	0	0+0	0	3+0	0
16	DF	(England) ENG	Jack Whatmough	30	0	26+0	0	4+0	0	0+0	0	0+0	0
17	MF	(Wales) WAL	Dion Donohue	13	1	5+5	0	2+0	0	0+0	0	1+0	1
18	FW	(England) ENG	Louis Dennis	8	1	0+1	0	2+0	0	0+0	0	4+1	1
19	FW	(Nigeria) NGA	Viv Solomon-Otabor	10	1	6+3	1	0+0	0	0+0	0	1+0	0
20	DF	(England) ENG	Nathan Thompson	30	0	32+1	0	2+0	0	0+0	0	3+0	1
22	FW	(England) ENG	Omar Bogle	13	4	7+6	4	0+0	0	0+0	0	0+0	0
24	MF	(England) ENG	Bryn Morris	8	1	5+2	1	0+1	0	0+0	0	0+0	0
26	MF	(England) ENG	Gareth Evans	56	13	36+8	10	4+1	0	1+0	0	4+2	3
29	FW	(England) ENG	Leon Maloney	1	0	0+0	0	0+0	0	0+0	0	0+1	0
30	MF	(England) ENG	Adam May	5	0	0+0	0	1+0	0	0+0	0	4+0	0
31	DF	(England) ENG	Matt Casey	3	0	0+0	0	0+0	0	0+0	0	3+0	0
32	FW	(England) ENG	James Vaughan	11	0	2+9	0	0+0	0	0+0	0	0+0	0
33	MF	(England) ENG	Ben Close	46	9	27+9	8	2+1	0	1+0	0	6+0	1
34	FW	(England) ENG	Dan Smith	2	0	0+0	0	0+0	0	0+0	0	2+0	0
35	GK	(England) ENG	Alex Bass	1	0	0+0	0	0+0	0	0+0	0	1+0	0
36	DF	(Tanzania) TAN	Haji Mnoga	3	0	0+0	0	0+0	0	0+0	0	3+0	0
38	DF	(England) ENG	Brandon Haunstrup	12	0	2+3	0	0+0	0	1+0	0	6+0	0
39	MF	(England) ENG	Freddie Read	2	0	0+0	0	0+0	0	0+0	0	1+1	0
40	FW	(England) ENG	Bradley Lethbridge	2	0	0+0	0	0+0	0	0+0	0	2+0	0
Player(s) who featured whilst on loan but returned to parent club during the season:
14	FW	(Republic of Ireland) IRL	Joe Mason	4	0	0+1	0	0+0	0	0+0	0	1+2	0
22	FW	(England) ENG	David Wheeler	18	3	1+10	0	0+2	1	1+0	0	4+0	2
32	MF	(England) ENG	Ben Thompson	27	3	19+4	2	3+0	1	0+0	0	0+1	0
37	FW	(England) ENG	Andre Green	12	5	2+4	1	0+2	2	0+0	0	4+0	2
Player(s) who featured but departed permanently during the season:
4	MF	(England) ENG	Danny Rose	5	0	0+1	0	0+0	0	0+0	0	4+0	0
19	FW	(England) ENG	Conor Chaplin	1	0	0+0	0	0+0	0	0+1	0	0+0	0

=== Disciplinary record ===
As of match(es) played 16 May 2019

Players with no cards are not included on the list
Italics indicate a loaned in player

No.	Pos	Nat	Player	Total		League One (Note: Includes the 2019 EFL play-offs)		FA Cup		EFL Cup		EFL Trophy	
No.	Pos	Nat	Player	Yellow card	Red card	Yellow card	Red card	Yellow card	Red card	Yellow card	Red card	Yellow card	Red card
2	DF	(England) ENG	Anton Walkes	2	0	1	0	0	0	0	0	1	0
3	DF	(England) ENG	Lee Brown	6	0	5	0	1	0	0	0	0	0
5	DF	(England) ENG	Matt Clarke	5	0	5	0	0	0	0	0	0	0
6	DF	(England) ENG	Christian Burgess	7	0	5	0	1	0	0	0	1	0
7	MF	(England) ENG	Tom Naylor	12	0	11	0	0	0	1	0	0	0
8	FW	(Jersey) JER	Brett Pitman	3	0	3	0	0	0	0	0	0	0
9	FW	(England) ENG	Oliver Hawkins	4	0	4	0	0	0	0	0	0	0
10	FW	(Jamaica) JAM	Jamal Lowe	10	0	7	0	2	0	0	0	1	0
11	FW	(Republic of Ireland) IRL	Ronan Curtis	9	0	6	0	2	0	0	0	1	0
16	DF	(England) ENG	Jack Whatmough	6	0	5	0	1	0	0	0	0	0
17	MF	(Wales) WAL	Dion Donohue	2	0	2	0	0	0	0	0	0	0
18	FW	(England) ENG	Louis Dennis	1	0	0	0	0	0	0	0	1	0
20	DF	(England) ENG	Nathan Thompson	12	0	11	0	1	0	0	0	0	1
22	FW	(England) ENG	Omar Bogle	2	0	2	0	0	0	0	0	0	0
26	MF	(England) ENG	Gareth Evans	7	0	5	0	0	0	0	0	2	0
32	FW	(England) ENG	James Vaughan	2	0	2	0	0	0	0	0	0	0
33	MF	(England) ENG	Ben Close	7	0	5	0	0	0	1	0	1	0
Player(s) who featured whilst on loan but returned to parent club during the season:
22	FW	(England) ENG	David Wheeler	1	0	1	0	0	0	0	0	0	0
32	MF	(England) ENG	Ben Thompson	5	1	5	1	0	0	0	0	0	0
Squad Total				103	1	85	1	8	0	2	0	8	0
