= Ben Close =

English footballer (born 1996)

Personal information
- Full name: Ben Easton Close
- Date of birth: 8 August 1996 (age 30)
- Place of birth: Portsmouth, England
- Height: 5 ft 9 in (1.75 m)
- Position: Midfielder

Youth career
- –2014: Portsmouth

Senior career*
Years	Team	Apps	(Gls)
2014–2021	Portsmouth	138	(14)
2015	→ Poole Town (loan)	7	(1)
2017	→ Eastleigh (loan)	9	(0)
2021–2026	Doncaster Rovers	101	(6)
2025	→ Eastleigh (loan)	16	(0)
- * Club domestic league appearances and goals as of 14 April 2026 (UTC)

Ben Easton Close (born 8 August 1996) is an English professional footballer who plays as a central midfielder.

== Career ==
=== Portsmouth ===
Born in Portsmouth, Close signed a two-year scholarship deal after spending many years in Portsmouth's youth categories. He was an unused substitute for a first team game on 3 May 2014 for a league game against Plymouth Argyle.

On 9 May 2014, Close was offered a one-year professional contract with the club, alongside Bradley Tarbuck. On 12 September 2014, he made his professional debut, coming on as a 43rd minute substitute for Nigel Atangana in a 3–1 away win against Yeovil Town, for the campaign's Football League Trophy.

Close made his League Two debut on 16 September, again from the bench in a 3–0 home success against Dagenham & Redbridge. After playing only 4 games for Pompey in 2016–17, on 31 January 2017, he joined National League side Eastleigh on loan until the end of the season.

On 26 May 2017 Close signed a new one-year contract at Pompey, with the club holding an option for an additional year. On 17 December, after becoming a starter under new manager Kenny Jackett, he extended his contract until 2020.

On 2 March 2019, Close scored his first professional brace in a 5–1 home victory over Bradford City.

=== Doncaster Rovers ===
Close signed for Doncaster Rovers on a three-year deal on 7 June 2021. He made his first competitive appearance for the club on 7 August 2021 against AFC Wimbledon

Close featured regularly in the side until 27 November 2021, he was forced off at half-time in a 2–0 away defeat to Burton Albion with a knee injury shortly after returning to the side from a hamstring problem. The knock sustained at the Pirelli Stadium ended his involvement for the remainder of Doncaster’s League One campaign, compounding an injury-hit season and requiring assessment and rehabilitation.

After recovering, Close resumed first-team duties in the 2022–23 season in League Two following Doncaster’s relegation, making 36 league appearances and scoring twice as he re-established himself in the side. Following the conclusion of the 2022–23 season, Close earned the Player of the Year award.

On 16 September 2023, Close made his first appearance of the 2023–2024 season and scored a dramatic injury-time winner in a 2–1 away victory at Forest Green Rovers. The following week, he scored a brace in a 2–1 home win over Gillingham, with well-taken strikes in both halves including a long-range finish to seal the victory.

On 30 January 2024, Close suffered another injury which side-lined him for seven months. He later made his return in the EFL Trophy against Huddersfield Town on the 7 September 2024.

On 12 January 2025, Close featured in FA Cup third-round tie against Hull City. After the match finished level following extra time, the tie was decided by a penalty shoot-out. Close stepped up during the shoot-out and successfully converted his effort with a composed Panenka penalty, delicately chipping the ball down the centre of the goal. Rovers won the game 5-4 on penalties.

On 1 February 2025, Close joined Eastleigh on loan for the remainder of the season.

During the 2025–2026 season, Close scored back to back goals in the EFL cup in a 4-0 win against Middlesbrough and a 2-0 against Accrington Stanley.

In April 2026, it was announced that Close would depart the club upon the expiry of his contract.

== Career statistics ==
As of 12 January 2025

Club	Season	League			FA Cup		League Cup		Other		Total	
Club	Season	Division	Apps	Goals	Apps	Goals	Apps	Goals	Apps	Goals	Apps	Goals
Portsmouth	2014–15	League Two	6	0	1	0	0	0	2	0	9	0
Portsmouth	2015–16	League Two	7	0	3	0	2	0	2	0	14	0
Portsmouth	2016–17	League Two	0	0	1	0	0	0	3	0	4	0
Portsmouth	2017–18	League One	40	2	1	0	1	0	3	0	45	2
Portsmouth	2018–19	League One	34	8	3	0	1	0	8	1	46	9
Portsmouth	2019–20	League One	29	3	5	2	3	1	7	0	44	6
Portsmouth	2020–21	League One	22	1	2	0	0	0	4	0	28	1
Portsmouth	Total		138	14	16	2	7	1	29	1	190	18
Poole Town (loan)	2014–15	SFL - Premier Division	5	0	0	0	0	0	3	1	8	1
Eastleigh (loan)	2016–17	National League	9	0	0	0	0	0	0	0	9	0
Doncaster Rovers	2021–22	League One	14	0	0	0	2	0	1 (Note: Appearance(s) in EFL Trophy)	0	17	0
Doncaster Rovers	2022–23	League Two	36	2	1	0	0	0	1	0	38	2
Doncaster Rovers	2023–24	League Two	20	3	2	0	0	0	5	1	27	4
Doncaster Rovers	2024–25	League Two	7	0	1	0	0	0	3	0	11	0
	Total		77	5	4	0	2	0	10	1	93	6
Career total			229	19	20	2	9	1	42	3	300	25

== Honours ==
Portsmouth

- EFL Trophy: 2018–19; runner-up: 2019–20

Doncaster Rovers

- EFL League Two: 2024–25
