= Leon Maloney =

English footballer (born 2001)

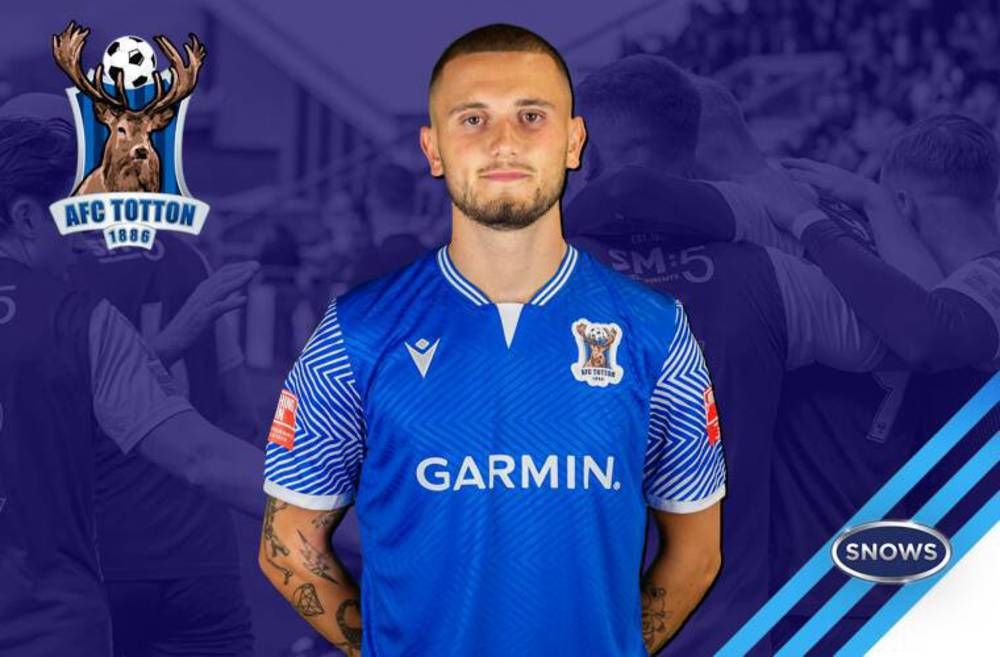
- Maloney in November 2017

Personal information
- Full name: Leon Harry Maloney
- Date of birth: 13 May 2001 (age 25)
- Place of birth: Isle of Wight, England
- Height: 6 ft 2 in (1.87 m)
- Position: Winger

Team information
- Current team: Havant & Waterlooville

Youth career
- 2010–2019: Portsmouth

Senior career*
Years	Team	Apps	(Gls)
2018–2020	Portsmouth	0	(0)
2018–2019	→ Bognor Regis Town (loan)	10	(0)
2020–2021	FC Volendam	7	(0)
2020–2023	Jong FC Volendam	40	(3)
2023–2024	AFC Totton	34	(9)
2024–	Havant & Waterlooville	25	(5)
- * Club domestic league appearances and goals as of 13:25, 7 June 2024 (UTC)

Leon Harry Maloney (born 13 May 2001) is an English footballer who plays as a winger for Southern League Premier Division South club Havant & Waterlooville. He has previously played professionally for Portsmouth, appearing in the EFL Trophy, and FC Voldendam, making appearances in the Eerste Divisie.

== Club career ==
=== Portsmouth ===
He made his Portsmouth first team debut on 8 January 2019 coming on in a 2–0 win against Southend United in the EFL Trophy.

On 13 November 2018, Maloney was loaned out to Bognor Regis Town for the rest of 2018, to gain some first team playing experience to make the jump from academy to senior football. On 22 February 2019, he was loaned out to the same club again, this time for the remainder of the season.

On 30 April 2019, Maloney was offered a third year scholarship with Portsmouth. He scored his first goal for the club, and his first professional goal, in an EFL Trophy tie against Northampton Town on 3 December 2019.

=== Volendam ===
On 30 January 2020 Maloney signed a contract to go and play for the Dutch club FC Volendam. After making 7 appearances in the 2020–21 Eerste Divisie for the club, he played only for their Under-21 squad in the third-tier Tweede Divisie since then.

=== English non-league ===
On 12 August 2023, Maloney signed for newly promoted AFC Totton of the Southern League Premier Division, in the 7th tier of the English football pyramid.

On 6 June 2024, Maloney joined Havant & Waterlooville following their relegation to the Southern Premier Division South.

== Personal life ==
Leon's older brother Jack Maloney also played first-team football for Portsmouth.

== Career statistics ==
As of end of 2021–22 season

Appearances and goals by club, season and competition
Club	Season	League			National cup		League cup		Other		Total	
Club	Season	Division	Apps	Goals	Apps	Goals	Apps	Goals	Apps	Goals	Apps	Goals
Portsmouth	2018–19	League One	0	0	0	0	0	0	1	0	1	0
Portsmouth	2019–20	League One	0	0	0	0	0	0	4	1	4	1
Portsmouth	Total		0	0	0	0	0	0	5	1	5	1
Bognor Regis Town (loan)	2018–19	Isthmian League Premier Division	10	0	0	0	—		2	1	12	1
Jong Volendam	2019–20	Tweede Divisie	3	0	—		—		—		3	0
Jong Volendam	2020–21	Tweede Divisie	4	1	—		—		—		4	1
Jong Volendam	2021–22	Tweede Divisie	13	1	—		—		2	0	15	1
Jong Volendam	Total		20	2	—		—		2	0	22	2
Volendam	2020–21	Eerste Divisie	7	0	0	0	—		0	0	7	0
Career total			37	2	0	0	0	0	9	2	46	4

== Honours ==
Bognor Regis Town

- Sussex Senior Cup: 2018–19
