= Brett Pitman =

Jèrriais footballer (born 1988)

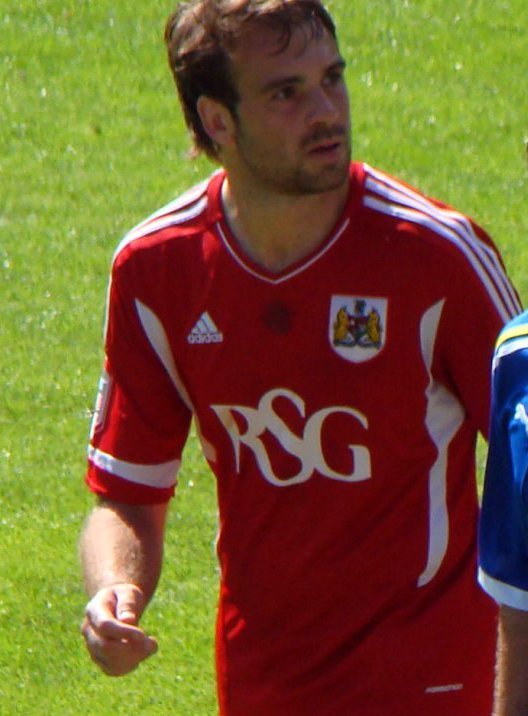
- Pitman playing for Bristol City in 2011

Personal information
- Full name: Brett Douglas Pitman
- Date of birth: 31 January 1988 (age 38)
- Place of birth: Saint Helier, Jersey
- Height: 6 ft 0 in (1.83 m)
- Position: Forward

Youth career
- First Tower United
- 1999–2004: St. Paul's
- 2004–2005: AFC Bournemouth

Senior career*
Years	Team	Apps	(Gls)
2005–2010	AFC Bournemouth	173	(59)
2010–2013	Bristol City	77	(20)
2012	→ AFC Bournemouth (loan)	6	(3)
2013–2015	AFC Bournemouth	88	(34)
2015–2017	Ipswich Town	61	(14)
2017–2020	Portsmouth	81	(37)
2020–2021	Swindon Town	38	(11)
2021–2022	Bristol Rovers	16	(4)
2022	→ Eastleigh (loan)	17	(1)
2022–2023	AFC Portchester	38	(44)
2023–2024	Shaftesbury	38	(56)
2024	Baffins Milton Rovers	13	(12)
2024–2025	→ Shaftesbury (dual-registration)	16	(5)
2024–2025	→ AFC Portchester (dual-registration)	7	(4)
2025	Dorchester Town	9	(4)
2025	→ AFC Portchester (dual-registration)	4	(2)
2025–2026	Downton	0	(0)
2026–2026	Midhurst & Easebourne	10	(12)

International career
2004	Jersey U18	1	(0)
- * Club domestic league appearances and goals as of 09:20, 31 October 2025 (UTC)

Brett Douglas Pitman (born 31 January 1988) is a Jèrriais footballer who most recently played as a forward for Midhurst & Easebourne in the Southern Combination Football League.

After starting his career on his native island, he moved to Bournemouth as a 16-year-old and went on to become a regular in their first team, helping them avoid relegation from The Football League in 2009 and earn promotion a year later. In August 2010, he moved to Championship side Bristol City.

In November 2012 he was loaned back to Bournemouth, until making the deal permanent in January 2013, and contributed to them winning the Football League Championship title in 2015. He then signed for Ipswich Town, then Portsmouth two years later.

== Club career ==
=== Early career and AFC Bournemouth ===
Pitman was born in Saint Helier, Jersey, and began his football career in the Jersey Football Combination with local clubs First Tower United and St. Paul's. After scoring four goals for the island's under-18 team against AFC Bournemouth, he was signed by the Football League club and played in their youth team under Eddie Howe.

Pitman made his professional debut on 24 August 2005 in the second round of the Football League Cup, as a 114th-minute substitute for Stephen Cooke in a goalless draw away to Torquay United. Bournemouth won 4–3 on penalties. Three days later, he played his first league game, replacing Dani Rodrigues for the final two minutes of a 2–1 away win over Bradford City in League One. On 18 October, he scored his first goal for the Cherries in the Football League Trophy, a penalty to open a 4–1 win over Aldershot Town at Dean Court, and his sole league goal of 19 games that season was scored on 18 February 2006, in the fourth minute of a 1–1 home draw with Blackpool.

Pitman scored seven goals during the 2007–08 season, but was unable to prevent Bournemouth from being relegated to League Two. The following season, he was sent off just three minutes after he came on as a substitute in Bournemouth's FA Cup second round exit against non-league side Blyth Spartans. On 4 April 2009, he scored a hat-trick in a 4–0 home win over promotion-chasing Rochdale as Howe's Bournemouth gained points to retain their place in The Football League. He totalled 26 goals in 2009–10 as the Cherries won promotion back to League One, including one on 1 May 2010 as they sealed their promotion with a game remaining by defeating Port Vale 4–0.

Pitman scored a 16-minute hat-trick in the first home game of the 2010–11 season, a 5–1 win against Peterborough United on 14 August 2010. Three days later it was reported by Sky Sports News that newly promoted Premier League side Blackpool had made a bid of £400,000, possibly rising to £600,000, to sign him. The following day, it was reported that Bournemouth chairman Eddie Mitchell had blocked the bid and that the Seasiders had been prevented from opening talks with Pitman. Mitchell did not reveal the financial details of the offer but confirmed he had told Blackpool it was unacceptable. Later that same day, Bournemouth confirmed on their official website that they had accepted an offer from Blackpool and that personal terms were being discussed. On 19 August, Blackpool manager Ian Holloway confirmed that Pitman was having a medical with the club following talks with Holloway and the acting Chief Executive Karl Oyston. A day later it was confirmed that Pitman had failed to agree terms over the move to Blackpool after initial talks.

=== Bristol City ===
On 21 August 2010, Bristol City announced on their official site that they had agreed an undisclosed fee with Bournemouth and that Pitman, who had already agreed personal terms, would sign for them two days later subject to a medical. The fee was rumoured to be in the region of £1 million.

Pitman made his Championship debut eight days later, playing the full 90 minutes of a 2–0 loss at Ipswich Town. He partnered Jon Stead, and Sky Sports deemed his performance to be "quiet". Pitman did not score for the Robins until his 13th game on 20 November, when he came on at half time for Lee Johnson and opened a 2–0 win over Leicester City at Ashton Gate that moved his team out of the relegation zone. On 9 April 2012, he was sent off at the end of a 3–1 home win over Coventry City for a foul on Jordan Clarke.

Pitman totalled 20 goals in 81 games for City, but started only 36 of those games. Under the management of Derek McInnes, he started just 10 of 30. Pitman told BBC South Today that his work and goalscoring rate should have led to more starts.

=== Return to AFC Bournemouth ===
On 20 November 2012, Pitman returned to Bournemouth on a loan that would become a 3 1/2-year deal when the transfer window opened again in January, and reunited with Howe. Four days after his return, he came on as a 73rd-minute substitute for Matt Tubbs away to Bury and scored an added-time equaliser to ensure a 2–2 draw at Gigg Lane. On 26 January 2013, he scored all of the Cherries' goals in their 3–1 home win over Crewe Alexandra, two of which were penalties, and was substituted so that he could receive a standing ovation. He finished the season with a streak of nine goals across eight consecutive games, concluding on 20 April with one in a 3–1 home win over Carlisle United that won promotion to the Championship.

During the 2014–15 season Pitman helped Bournemouth win the Championship title and in doing so earn promotion to the Premier League for the first time in the club's 125-year history. He scored 13 goals across 34 league games, including a first-half hat-trick on 14 March 2015 in a 4–0 home win over Blackpool. He was praised by Howe for allowing Callum Wilson to take a penalty in the second half despite Pitman being the designated taker.

=== Ipswich Town ===
On 26 June 2015, Pitman remained in the Championship, joining Ipswich Town on a three-year deal. He made his debut on 11 August in a home game against Stevenage in the first round of the League Cup, assisting Jay Tabb's winner in a 2–1 victory. Eleven days later he scored his first goal for the Tractor Boys, heading Freddie Sears' cross to open a 2–1 away win over Preston North End. He scored 11 goals in his debut season at Ipswich, finishing the season as the team's top goalscorer.

He scored his first goal of the 2016–17 season on 9 September in a 2–1 loss to Reading. On 17 December he scored twice in a 3–2 away win over Wigan Athletic at the DW Stadium. Pitman struggled for regular game time during the season, making 23 appearances in all competitions and scoring 4 goals. On 10 May 2017, he was told that he was free to find a new club, despite having another year left on his contract.

=== Portsmouth ===
On 13 July 2017, Pitman signed a three-year deal with League One club, Portsmouth for an undisclosed fee. Manager Kenny Jackett gave him the captain's armband ahead of their return to the third tier of English football. He scored twice on his Portsmouth debut in a 2–0 home win over Rochdale on 5 August. He was named League One Player of the Month for September 2017, scoring six times in seven games.

Pitman finished his first season at Fratton Park as the league's second top scorer and Portsmouth's top scorer with 25 goals across all competitions. Coming just behind Peterborough United's Jack Marriott in the league, he was the first Pompey player to pass 20 goals in a season since Svetoslav Todorov when the team won the 2002–03 Football League First Division.

In 2019–20, Pitman was stripped of his captaincy which was given to Tom Naylor in September and did not play past December. He was an unused substitute only five times for the rest of the season, was exiled from training and had to practice with Bournemouth's under-21 team to keep fit. He ended his Pompey career with 41 goals from 99 games.

=== Swindon Town ===
On 4 September 2020, Pitman signed for newly promoted League One club Swindon Town on a one-year deal. At the end of the season, the club triggered extensions to his and Jonathan Grounds's contracts, but after staff were not paid their wages for June, neither he nor Grounds turned up to pre-season training. On 30 July 2021 Pitman'contract was cancelled by mutual consent.

=== Bristol Rovers ===
On 30 July 2021 Pitman signed for League Two club Bristol Rovers on a one-year deal. On 18 September 2021, Pitman scored his first goal for the club with a consolation 92nd-minute penalty in a 3–1 home defeat to Leyton Orient. On 29 January 2022, following a 1–0 home victory against Walsall, a match Pitman was not in the squad for, manager Joey Barton revealed that Pitman would be allowed to leave the club before the transfer deadline day two days later. Having spent the second half of the season away on loan, Pitman was released at the end of the season following Rovers' immediate promotion back to League One.

==== Eastleigh (loan) ====
On 3 February 2022, Pitman joined National League side Eastleigh on loan until the end of the 2021–22 season. Pitman made seventeen appearances for the club, scoring one goal in a 5–3 defeat to Solihull Moors.

=== Non-League ===
Following his release from Bristol Rovers, Pitman joined Wessex League side AFC Portchester on a one-year deal, signing in a player/coach role. In January 2023, Pitman became the first player in the top nine tiers of English football to reach thirty goals, having scored thirty-six in all competitions.

Ahead of the 2023–24 season, following 50 goals and 12 assists in 47 appearances in all competitions for Porchester, Pitman signed for Shaftesbury. On 30 December 2023, Pitman scored seven in an 8–2 win for Shaftesbury against Christchurch. The season ended in success for Shaftesbury, Pitman's 61st goal of the season proving decisive in the play-off final as the club were promoted. In addition to the team success, Pitman had individual success with his personal tally of fifty-six goals in thirty-eight league games breaking the league record for most goals in a season.

On 1 July 2024, Pitman returned to the Wessex Premier Division, joining Baffins Milton Rovers.

In October 2024, Pitman returned to Southern League Division One South side Shaftesbury on a dual-registration basis. In November 2024, he returned to AFC Portchester, remaining dual-registered with Shaftesbury.

On 21 March 2025, Pitman joined Southern League Premier Division South side Dorchester Town. In September 2025, he returned to AFC Portchester for a third spell, on a dual-registration basis.

In October 2025, Pitman returned to the Wessex League Premier Division, joining Downton in a player-coach role.

== International career ==
In March 2004, Pitman represented Jersey's under-18 side in their first international in a draw against Northern Ireland U18.

In November 2016, Pitman spoke of his desire to represent Jersey at international level if they become full UEFA members. Their membership had been rejected due to a new rule saying that members should be sovereign nations, brought in after the controversial admittance of Gibraltar in 2013.

== Career statistics ==
As of match played 14 October 2025

Appearances and goals by club, season and competition
Club	Season	League			FA Cup		League Cup		Other		Total	
Club	Season	Division	Apps	Goals	Apps	Goals	Apps	Goals	Apps	Goals	Apps	Goals
AFC Bournemouth	2005–06	League One	19	1	0	0	2	0	2 (Note: Appearances in the Football League Trophy)	1	23	2
AFC Bournemouth	2006–07	League One	28	5	2	0	0	0	0	0	30	5
AFC Bournemouth	2007–08	League One	39	7	3	0	1	0	3	0	46	7
AFC Bournemouth	2008–09	League Two	39	17	3	0	0	0	3	0	45	17
AFC Bournemouth	2009–10	League Two	46	26	2	1	1	0	1	1	50	28
AFC Bournemouth	2010–11	League One	2	3	0	0	1	0	0	0	3	3
AFC Bournemouth	Total		173	59	10	1	5	0	9	2	197	62
Bristol City	2010–11	Championship	39	13	1	0	0	0	–		40	13
Bristol City	2011–12	Championship	35	7	1	0	1	0	–		37	7
Bristol City	2012–13	Championship	3	0	0	0	1	0	–		4	0
Bristol City	Total		77	20	2	0	2	0	–		81	20
AFC Bournemouth	2012–13	League One	26	19	2	0	0	0	0	0	28	19
AFC Bournemouth	2013–14	Championship	34	5	2	2	1	0	–		37	7
AFC Bournemouth	2014–15	Championship	34	13	1	0	4	1	–		39	14
AFC Bournemouth	Total		94	37	5	2	5	1	–		104	40
Ipswich Town	2015–16	Championship	42	10	2	0	3	1	–		47	11
Ipswich Town	2016–17	Championship	22	4	1	0	0	0	–		23	4
Ipswich Town	Total		64	14	3	0	3	1	–		70	15
Portsmouth	2017–18	League One	38	24	1	0	1	0	1 (Note: Appearances in the EFL Trophy)	1	41	25
Portsmouth	2018–19	League One	32	11	5	0	1	0	4	2	42	13
Portsmouth	2019–20	League One	11	2	1	1	2	0	2	1	16	4
Portsmouth	Total		81	37	7	1	4	0	7	4	99	42
Swindon Town	2020–21	League One	38	11	1	1	1	0	2	0	42	12
Bristol Rovers	2021–22	League Two	16	4	2	0	0	0	0	0	18	4
Eastleigh (loan)	2021–22	National League	17	1	0	0	—		0	0	17	1
AFC Portchester	2022–23	Wessex Premier Division	37	44	2	0	—		7 (Note: Two appearances and six goals in FA Vase, one appearance in Wessex League Cup, one appearance in Hampshire Senior Cup, three appearances in Portsmouth Senior Cup)	6	46	50
Shaftesbury	2023–24	Wessex Premier Division	38	56	1	0	—		8 (Note: One appearance in FA Vase, two appearances and one goal in Wessex League Cup, three appearances and two goals in Dorset Senior Cup, two appearances and two goals in Wessex League Premier Division play-offs)	5	47	61
Baffins Milton Rovers	2024–25	Wessex Premier Division	13	12	3	1	—		4 (Note: Two appearances and four goals in FA Vase, one appearance in Wessex League Cup, one appearance and one goal in Portsmouth Senior Cup)	5	20	18
Shaftesbury (loan)	2024–25	Southern Division One South	16	5	—		—		2 (Note: Appearances in Dorset Senior Cup)	3	18	8
AFC Portchester	2024–25	Wessex Premier Division	7	4	—		—		0	0	7	4
Dorchester Town	2024–25	Southern Premier Division South	5	4	0	0	—		0	0	5	4
Dorchester Town	2025–26	Southern Premier Division South	4	0	1	0	—		0	0	5	0
Dorchester Town	Total		9	4	1	0	0	0	0	0	10	4
AFC Portchester (dual-registration)	2025–26	Isthmian League South Central Division	4	2	0	0	—		1 (Note: Appearance(s) in Alan Turvey Trophy)	1	5	3
Career total			684	310	37	6	20	2	40	26	781	344

== Honours ==
Bournemouth

- Football League Championship: 2014–15
- Football League One second-place promotion: 2012–13
- Football League Two second-place promotion: 2009–10

Portsmouth

- EFL Trophy: 2018–19

Shaftesbury

- Wessex League Premier Division play-off winners: 2024

Individual

- Football League Two Player of the Month: September 2009
- Football/EFL League One Player of the Month: March 2013, September 2017
