= Alex Bass =

English footballer (born 1998)

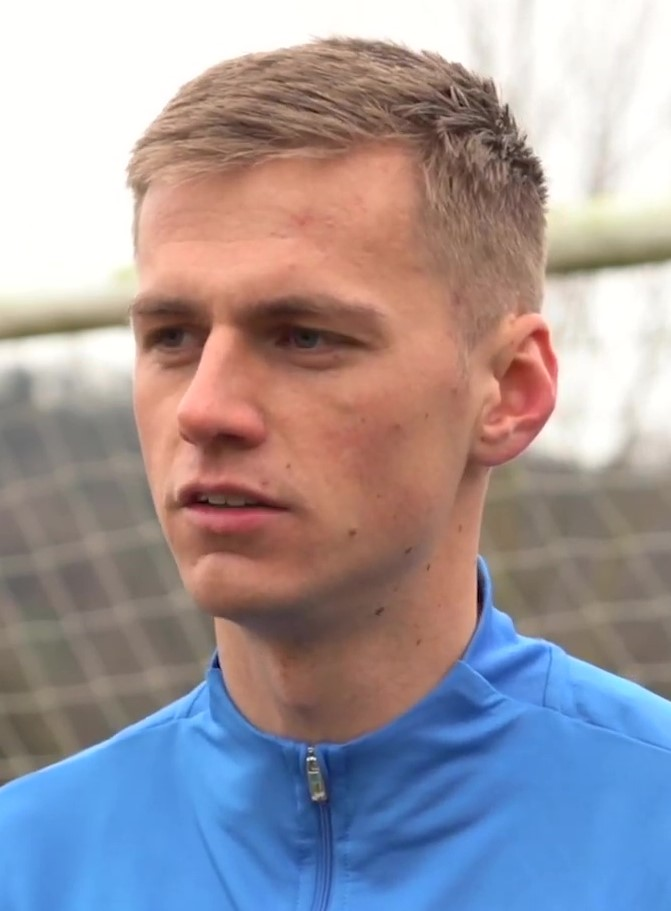

Personal information
- Full name: Alexander Michael Bass
- Date of birth: 1 April 1998 (age 28)
- Place of birth: Huntingdon, England
- Height: 6 ft 3 in (1.91 m)
- Position: Goalkeeper

Team information
- Current team: Peterborough United
- Number: 1

Youth career
- –2016: Portsmouth

Senior career*
Years	Team	Apps	(Gls)
2015–2022	Portsmouth	18	(0)
2016–2017	→ Salisbury (loan)	37	(0)
2018	→ Torquay United (loan)	8	(0)
2021	→ Southend United (loan)	1	(0)
2022	→ Bradford City (loan)	21	(0)
2022–2024	Sunderland	0	(0)
2023–2024	→ AFC Wimbledon (loan)	44	(0)
2024–2025	Notts County	39	(0)
2025–	Peterborough United	50	(0)
- * Club domestic league appearances and goals as of 17:13, 10 October 2026 (BST)

Alexander Michael Bass (born 1 April 1998) is an English professional footballer who plays as a goalkeeper for EFL League One club Peterborough United.

== Club career ==
=== Portsmouth ===
Born in Huntingdon, Bass progressed through Portsmouth's youth categories. He first appeared on the first team bench on 7 March 2015 at the age of 16, he went onto feature on the Portsmouth bench a further 36 times before making his debut in a 3–2 defeat at Coventry City in the EFL Cup on the 9 August 2016.

==== Salisbury (loan) ====
On 16 August 2016, Bass was loaned to Southern League South & West side Salisbury in an initial one-month deal, before returning to Portsmouth at the end of the season.

==== Return to Portsmouth ====
On 5 May 2018, Bass made his first league start for Pompey, keeping a clean sheet in the 2–0 home win in their final League One game of the season against Peterborough. Four days later, the club took up the option of extension on his contract and renewed it for a further year.

==== Torquay United (loan) ====
On 9 July 2018, Bass signed a new three-year contract at Portsmouth and moved on loan to National League South side Torquay United for their 2018–19 title winning season.

==== Bradford City (loan) ====
Bass moved on loan to Bradford City in January 2022.

==== Southend United (loan) ====
On 27 February 2021, Bass joined Southend United on an emergency loan, for the remainder of the 2020–21 season.

=== Sunderland ===
On 26 July 2022, Bass signed for Sunderland on a three-year deal. In October 2022, he scored a last-minute equaliser for Sunderland U21s against rivals Newcastle United U21s in the Premier League 2 Division Two.

==== AFC Wimbledon (loan) ====
On 12 July 2023, Alex Bass joined AFC Wimbledon on a season long loan.

=== Notts County ===
On 18 June 2024, Alex Bass joined Notts County on a three-year deal.

=== Peterborough United ===
On 30 June 2025, Bass joined League One side Peterborough United for an undisclosed fee, signing an initial three-year contract with the option for a further year. Prior to the commencement of the 2025–26 season, he suffered a broken foot in a pre-season friendly against Milton Keynes Dons, estimate to rule him out for a period of six weeks.

== Career statistics ==
As of match played 7 February 2026

Club	Season	League			FA Cup		League Cup		Other		Total	
Club	Season	Division	Apps	Goals	Apps	Goals	Apps	Goals	Apps	Goals	Apps	Goals
Portsmouth	2016–17	League Two	0	0	0	0	1	0	0	0	1	0
Portsmouth	2017–18	League One	1	0	0	0	0	0	1 (Note: Appearance(s) in EFL Trophy)	0	2	0
Portsmouth	2018–19	League One	0	0	0	0	0	0	1	0	1	0
Portsmouth	2019–20	League One	15	0	3	0	0	0	7 (Note: 5 appearances in EFL Trophy, 2 appearances in EFL League One play-offs)	0	25	0
Portsmouth	2020–21	League One	0	0	1	0	1	0	3	0	5	0
Portsmouth	2021–22	League One	2	0	0	0	1	0	4	0	7	0
Portsmouth	Total		18	0	4	0	3	0	16	0	41	0
Salisbury (loan)	2016–17	SFL - Division One S&W	37	0	0	0	—		9	0	46	0
Torquay United (loan)	2018–19	National League South	8	0	0	0	—		0	0	8	0
Southend United (loan)	2020–21	League Two	1	0	—		—		—		1	0
Bradford City (loan)	2021–22	League Two	21	0	—		—		—		21	0
Sunderland	2022–23	Championship	0	0	1	0	1	0	0	0	2	0
AFC Wimbledon (loan)	2023–24	League Two	44	0	3	0	1	0	0	0	48	0
Notts County	2024–25	League Two	39	0	2	0	0	0	2 (Note: Appearance(s) in EFL League Two play-offs)	0	43	0
Peterborough United	2025–26	League One	24	0	2	0	0	0	1	0	27	0
Career total			192	0	12	0	5	0	28	0	237	0

== Honours ==
Portsmouth

- EFL Trophy: 2018–19
