= Bradley Lethbridge =

English footballer (born 2000)

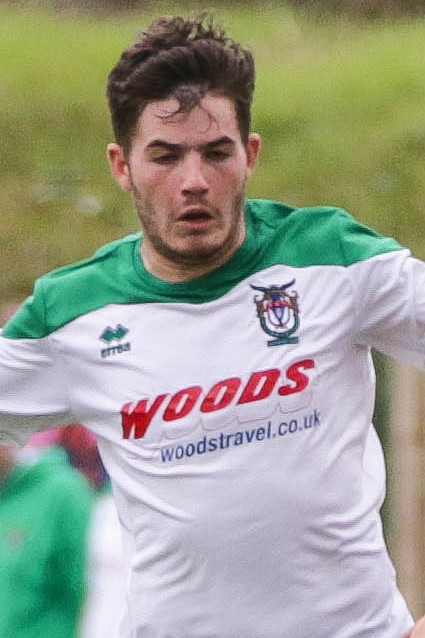
- Lethbridge playing for Bognor Regis Town in 2018

Personal information
- Full name: Bradley Stephen Lethbridge
- Date of birth: 22 December 2000 (age 25)
- Place of birth: Gosport, England
- Position: Forward

Team information
- Current team: Colden Common

Youth career
- 2010–2011: Portsmouth
- 2014–2019: Portsmouth

Senior career*
Years	Team	Apps	(Gls)
2018–2020	Portsmouth	0	(0)
2018–2019	→ Bognor Regis Town (loan)	33	(10)
2019–2020	→ Bognor Regis Town (loan)	21	(3)
2020–2021	Bognor Regis Town	5	(2)
2021–2022	Gosport Borough	1	(0)
2022	AFC Portchester	11	(2)
2022	Horndean	2	(0)
2022	Pagham	2	(1)
2023	Baffins Milton Rovers	3	(1)
2023–	Colden Common	55	(38)
- * Club domestic league appearances and goals as of 08:43, 7 August 2024 (UTC)

Bradley Stephen Lethbridge (born 22 December 2000) is an English footballer who plays as a forward for Colden Common.

== Club career ==
=== Portsmouth ===
Lethbridge first joined Portsmouth as a central midfielder at the age of 10 but was released after just one year. In 2014 he returned to Pompey as a striker and signed apprenticeship terms with the club in 2017. In December 2017, Lethbridge was an unused sub in a Checkatrade Trophy match versus Northampton Town.

In July 2018, Lethbridge joined Isthmian League side Bognor Regis Town on loan.

On 13 November 2018, Lethbridge made his Portsmouth debut starting in a 3-2 Checkatrade Trophy win versus Tottenham Hotspur U21s.

On 30 April 2019, Lethbridge was offered a third year scholarship with Portsmouth. He scored his first goal for Portsmouth in an EFL Trophy tie against Oxford United on 8 October 2019.

On 12 May 2020, Lethbridge announced he would be released by Pompey at the end of his contract.

After his release Lethbridge signed for Bognor Regis Town permanently.

In May 2021, Lethbridge joined Gosport Borough. In January 2022, he joined Wessex League side after just one league appearance for Gosport Borough. In October 2022, he joined fellow Wessex League side Pagham. In January 2023, he signed for Baffins Milton Rovers. The following season Lethbridge was playing for Hampshire Premier League side Colden Common.

== Career statistics ==
As of match played 10 March 2020

Club	Season	League			FA Cup		League Cup		Other		Total	
Club	Season	Division	Apps	Goals	Apps	Goals	Apps	Goals	Apps	Goals	Apps	Goals
Portsmouth	2018–19	League One	0	0	0	0	0	0	2	0	2	0
Portsmouth	2019–20	League One	0	0	0	0	0	0	1	1	1	1
Bognor Regis Town (loans)	2018–19	Isthmian Premier Division	33	10	2	1	0	0	6	2	41	13
Bognor Regis Town (loans)	2019–20	Isthmian Premier Division	21	3	2	1	0	0	5	3	28	7
Career total			54	13	4	2	0	0	14	6	72	21
