= Joe Hancott =

English footballer

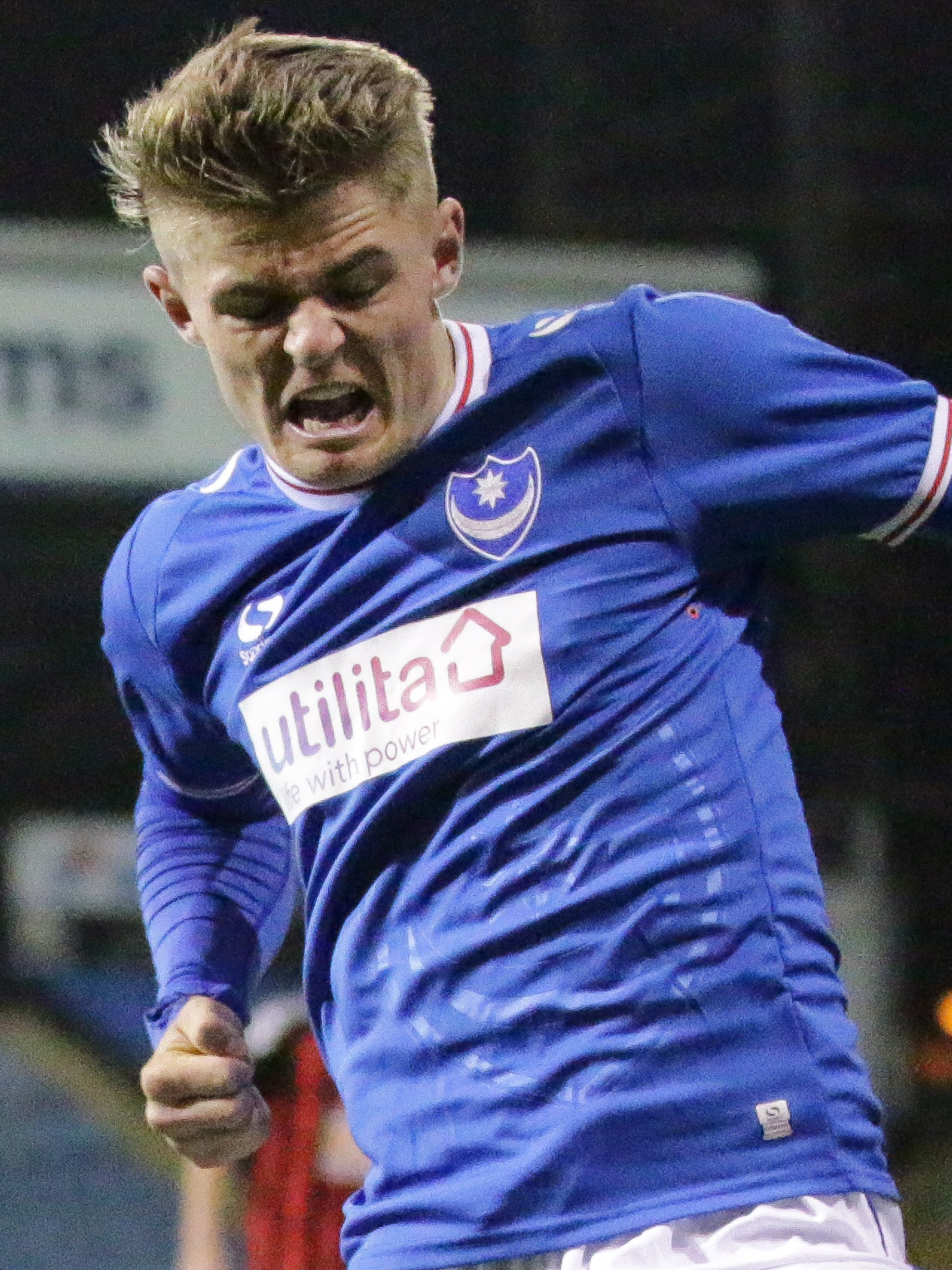
- Hancott in November 2017

Personal information
- Full name: Joe Mark Hancott
- Date of birth: 8 March 2001 (age 25)
- Place of birth: Isle of Wight, England
- Positions: Left-back; centre back

Team information
- Current team: Cowes Sports

Youth career
- 2009–2017: Portsmouth

Senior career*
Years	Team	Apps	(Gls)
2017–2021	Portsmouth	0	(0)
2019	→ Basingstoke Town (loan)	0	(0)
2019	→ Basingstoke Town (loan)	6	(0)
2019–2020	→ Bognor Regis Town (loan)	3	(0)
2021	Bognor Regis Town	0	(0)
2021–2023	Newport (IOW)	45	(2)
2023-	Cowes Sports	0	(0)
- * Club domestic league appearances and goals as of 07:45, 26 May 2023 (UTC)

Joe Mark Hancott (born 8 March 2001) is an English footballer who plays for Cowes Sports as a left-back and centre back.

== Career ==
=== Portsmouth ===
On 16 August 2017, Hancott made his Portsmouth debut playing in a 3–3 draw with Fulham U21s in the EFL Trophy. Hancott became Pompey's youngest ever debutant at 16 years and 161 days beating the record previously held by Gary O'Neil.

On 2 March 2019, Hancott signed for Basingstoke Town F.C., on a loan deal until the end of the season but returned to Portsmouth without making a single appearance.

On 30 April 2019, Hancott was offered a third year scholarship with Portsmouth.

In September 2019, Hancott joined Bognor Regis Town on loan.

In October 2019, Hancott suffered a season-ending ACL injury in his right knee. In the summer of 2020, his scholarship was extended by six months to give him a chance to prove he had recovered from his injury and that he deserved a longer deal.

Hancott was released by the club in March 2021.

=== Bognor Regis Town ===
On 26 March 2021, Hancott signed for Bognor Regis Town.

=== Newport IOW ===
On 20 November 2021, Hancott signed for Wessex Football League Division One club Newport (IOW).

Education

As of 2025, Mr Hancott currently teaches at Ryde Academy on the Isle of Wight.

== Career statistics ==
As of match played 12 October 2019.

Appearances and goals by club, season and competition
Club	Season	League			FA Cup		League Cup		Other		Total	
Club	Season	Division	Apps	Goals	Apps	Goals	Apps	Goals	Apps	Goals	Apps	Goals
Portsmouth	2017–18	League One	0	0	0	0	0	0	1 (Note: Appearance(s) in EFL Trophy)	0	1	0
Portsmouth	2018–19	League One	0	0	0	0	0	0	0	0	0	0
Portsmouth	2019–20	League One	0	0	0	0	0	0	2	0	2	0
Portsmouth	2020–21	League One	0	0	0	0	0	0	0	0	0	0
Portsmouth	Total		0	0	0	0	0	0	3	0	3	0
Basingstoke Town (loan)	2018–19	Southern League Premier Division South	0	0	0	0	0	0	0	0	0	0
Basingstoke Town (loan)	2019–20	Southern League Premier Division South	3	0	1	0	0	0	0	0	4	0
Bognor Regis Town (loan)	2019–20	Isthmian League Premier Division	3	0	0	0	0	0	0	0	3	0
Career total			6	0	1	0	0	0	3	0	10	0
