= Dan Smith (footballer, born 1999) =

English association football player

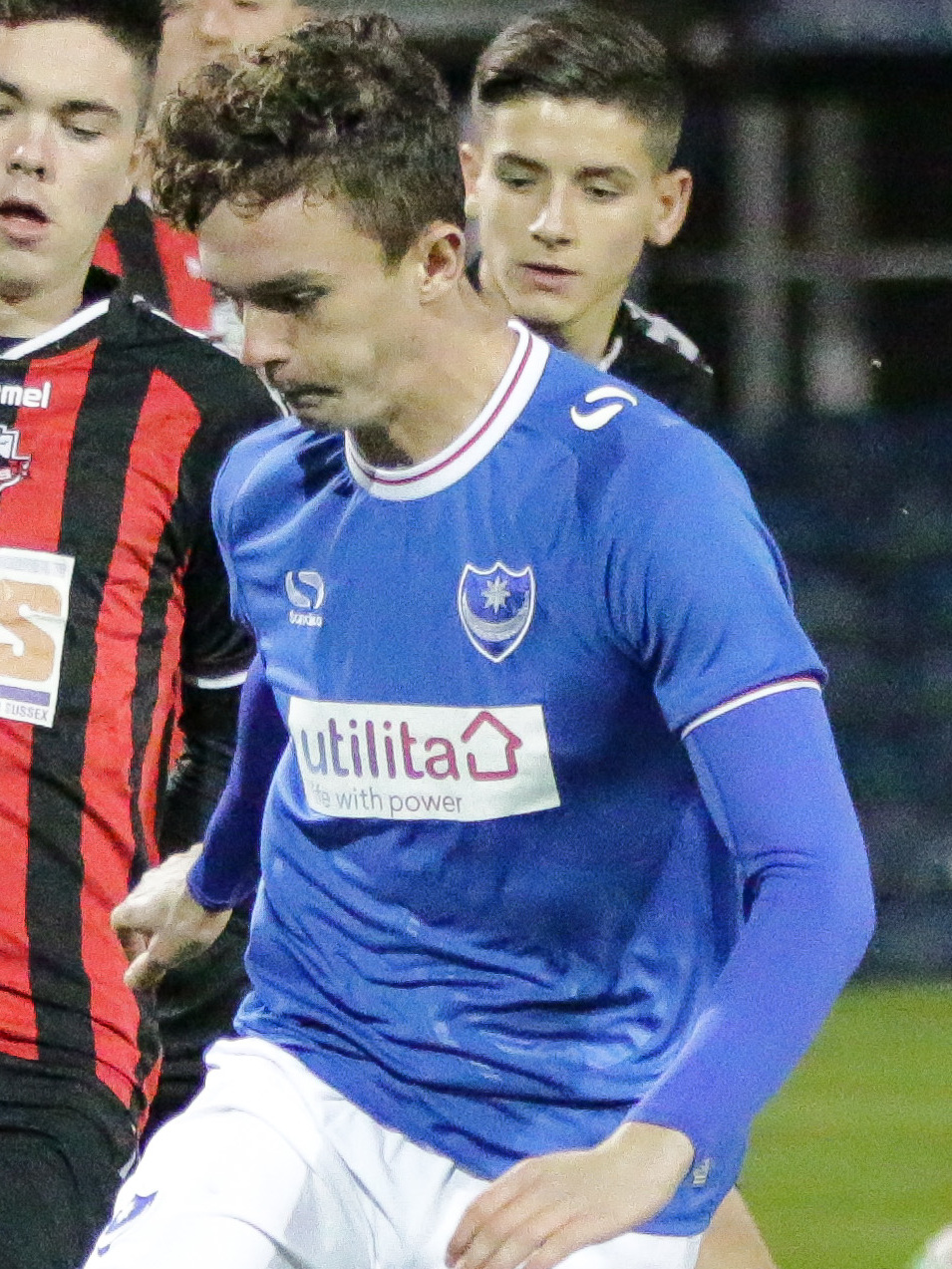
- Smith in November 2017

Personal information
- Full name: Daniel Lewis Smith
- Date of birth: 5 September 1999 (age 27)
- Place of birth: London, England
- Height: 1.90 m (6 ft 3 in)
- Position: Forward

Team information
- Current team: Dartford
- Number: 9

Youth career
- 2007–2018: Portsmouth

Senior career*
Years	Team	Apps	(Gls)
2018–2019	Portsmouth	0	(0)
2018–2019	→ Bognor Regis Town (loan)	19	(12)
2019	→ Cork City (loan)	8	(0)
2019–2020	Bognor Regis Town	32	(21)
2020–2022	Eastleigh	48	(3)
2021	→ Hereford (loan)	15	(6)
2022	→ Weymouth (loan)	5	(0)
2022–2023	Dulwich Hamlet	15	(3)
2023–2024	Bognor Regis Town	30	(5)
2024–2025	Folkestone Invicta	36	(15)
2025–	Dartford	51	(20)
- * Club domestic league appearances and goals as of 17:10, 21 November 2026 (UTC)

Daniel Lewis Smith (born 5 September 1999) is an English footballer who plays for Dartford.

Smith primarily plays as a centre-forward but has also featured as a central midfielder and as a right-back.

== Club career ==
=== Portsmouth ===
He made his Portsmouth first-team debut on 8 January 2019 starting in a 2–0 win against Southend United in the EFL Trophy. Smith spent the first half of the 2018–19 season on loan at Bognor Regis Town and scored 14 goals in 21 matches in all competitions.

==== Cork City (loan) ====
On 21 February 2019, Smith joined League of Ireland club Cork City on loan for the remainder of the EFL season. On 22 March 2019, he won his first senior honour as Cork defeated Midleton 3–1 to win the Munster Senior Cup.

=== Eastleigh ===
On 10 July 2020, Smith joined National League side Eastleigh following a prolific season with Bognor Regis Town. On 29 August 2021, he joined Hereford on loan. Following his loan spell at Hereford, he played a few games at Eastleigh before being sent on another loan spell to National League rivals Weymouth in February 2022, who were struggling in the relegation zone.

=== Dulwich Hamlet ===
On 8 July 2022, Smith joined National League South side Dulwich Hamlet., where he had a string of injuries and an operation over the course of the season.

=== Bognor Regis Town ===
In June 2023, Smith re-joined Bognor Regis.

=== Folkestone Invicta ===
On 5 June 2024, Smith joined Isthmian Premier Division side Folkestone Invicta and enamoured himself to the Invicta faithful by scoring twice in a 3–2 away victory over bitter rivals, Dover Athletic.

=== Dartford ===
On 6 June 2025, Smith joined Isthmian Premier Division side Dartford.

On 16 May 2026, it was confirmed that Smith would stay at Dartford for the 2026–27 season.

== Career statistics ==
As of match played 21 November 2026

Appearances and goals by club, season and competition
Club	Season	League			National Cup		League Cup		Other		Total	
Club	Season	Division	Apps	Goals	Apps	Goals	Apps	Goals	Apps	Goals	Apps	Goals
Portsmouth	2018–19	League One	0	0	0	0	0	0	2 (Note: Appearance(s) in the EFL Trophy)	0	2	0
Bognor Regis Town (loan)	2018–19	Isthmian Premier Division	19	12	1	1	—		1 (Note: Appearance(s) in the Sussex Senior Cup)	1	21	14
Cork City (loan)	2019	League Of Ireland	8	0	0	0	1	0	1 (Note: Appearance(s) in the Munster Senior Cup)	1	10	1
Bognor Regis Town	2019–20	Isthmian Premier Division	32	21	2	0	—		7	5	41	26
Eastleigh	2020–21	National League	37	2	1	0	—		1 (Note: Appearance(s) in the FA Trophy)	0	39	2
Eastleigh	2021–22	National League	11	1	0	0	—		0	0	11	1
Eastleigh	Total		48	3	1	0	0	0	1	0	50	3
Hereford (loan)	2021–22	National League North	15	6	—		—		—		15	6
Weymouth (loan)	2021–22	National League	5	0	—		—		—		5	0
Dulwich Hamlet	2022–23	National League South	15	3	0	0	—		1 (Note: Appearance(s) in the London Senior Cup)	0	16	3
Bognor Regis Town	2023–24	Isthmian Premier Division	30	5	1	0	—		5 (Note: Three appearances and one goal in the FA Trophy and two appearance and two goals in the Sussex Senior Cup)	3	36	8
Folkestone Invicta	2024–25	Isthmian Premier Division	36	15	1	1	—		3 (Note: Appearance(s) in the FA Trophy)	3	40	19
Dartford	2025–26	Isthmian Premier Division	33	11	1	0	—		1 (Note: Appearance(s) in the FA Trophy)	0	35	11
Dartford	2026–27	Isthmian Premier Division	18	9	4	1	—		2 (Note: Appearance(s) in the FA Trophy)	0	24	10
Dartford	Total		51	20	5	1	0	0	3	0	59	21
Career total			259	85	11	3	1	0	24	13	295	101

== Honours ==
Cork City

- Munster Senior Cup: 2018–19
