= Matthew Casey (footballer) =

English association football player

Sasha Casey
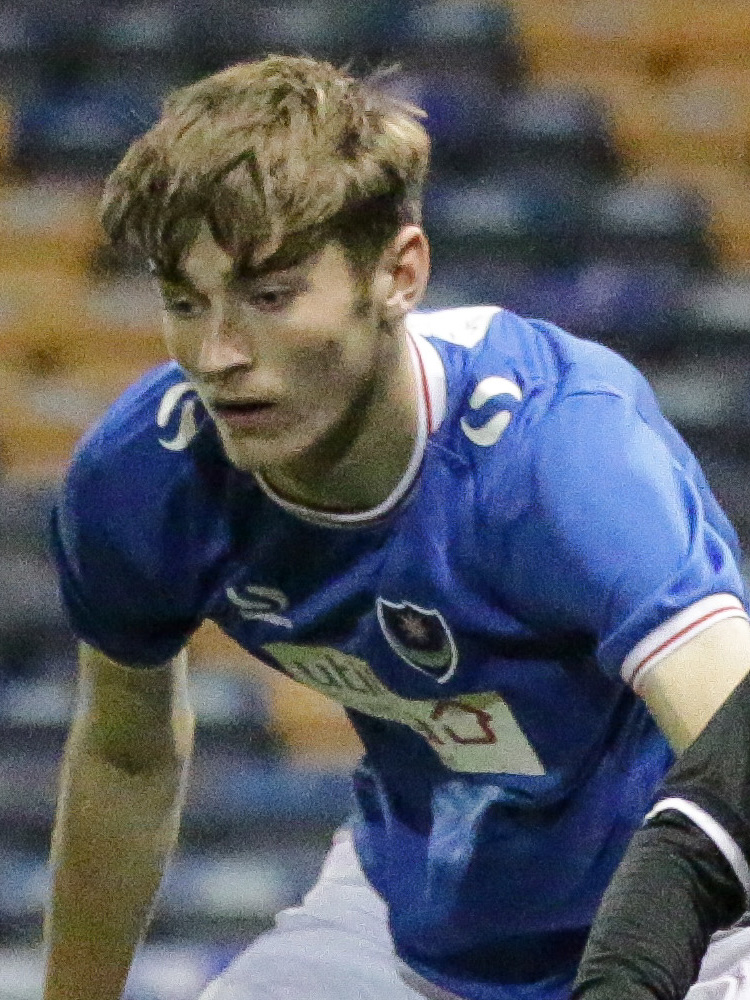
- Casey in November 2017

Personal information
- Full name: Matthew Adam Casey
- Date of birth: 13 November 1999 (age 27)
- Place of birth: Southampton, England
- Height: 2.01 m (6 ft 7 in)
- Position: Defender

Team information
- Current team: AFC Totton

Youth career
- Portsmouth

Senior career*
Years	Team	Apps	(Gls)
2018–2020	Portsmouth	0	(0)
2018	→ Weymouth (loan)	2	(0)
2018–2019	→ Gosport Borough (loan)	7	(0)
2019	→ Basingstoke Town (loan)	1	(0)
2019	→ Gosport Borough (loan)	6	(0)
2019	→ Havant & Waterlooville (loan)	1	(0)
2020	→ Bognor Regis Town (loan)	7	(1)
2020–2023	Gosport Borough		
2023–	AFC Totton		
- * Club domestic league appearances and goals as of 01:37, 5 August 2026 (UTC)

Matthew Adam Casey (born 13 November 1999) is an English professional footballer who plays for AFC Totton as a defender.

== Club career ==
=== Portsmouth ===
Casey signed a third year scholarship deal in May 2018 after two years with the under-18s. He made his Portsmouth first-team debut on 4 December 2018 in a 2–1 win against Arsenal U21s in the Checkatrade Trophy.

On 8 February 2019, Casey signed for Basingstoke Town, on a loan deal until the end of the season but played only once for them before returning to Gosport Borough on loan.

On 26 June 2019, Casey signed his first professional contract with Portsmouth.

During his time in the Portsmouth squad Casey was given the nickname 'Rodney' due to his striking resemblance to Rodney Trotter from Only Fools and Horses.

On 21 September 2019, Casey moved to Havant & Waterlooville on loan and made his debut on the same day in a 2–1 win against Taunton Town in the FA Cup.

Casey was released by Portsmouth at the end of the 2019–20 season.

=== Gosport Borough ===
On 7 September 2020, it was announced that Casey has signed for his former loan club Gosport Borough on a free transfer.

== Career statistics ==
As of match played 8 February 2020

Appearances and goals by club, season and competition
Club	Season	League			FA Cup		League Cup		Other		Total	
Club	Season	Division	Apps	Goals	Apps	Goals	Apps	Goals	Apps	Goals	Apps	Goals
Portsmouth	2018–19	League One	0	0	0	0	0	0	3	0	3	0
Weymouth (loan)	2018–19	Southern Premier South	2	0	0	0	—		0	0	2	0
Gosport Borough (loan)	2018–19	Southern Premier South	7	0	1	0	—		1	0	9	0
Basingstoke Town (loan)	2018–19	Southern Premier South	1	0	—		—		0	0	1	0
Gosport Borough (loan)	2018–19	Southern Premier South	6	0	—		—		0	0	6	0
Havant & Waterlooville (loan)	2019–20	National League South	1	0	1	0	0	0	0	0	2	0
Bognor Regis Town	2019–20	Isthmian Premier Division	7	1	0	0	0	0	0	0	7	1
Career total			24	1	2	0	0	0	4	0	30	1

== Honours ==
=== Portsmouth ===
- EFL Trophy: 2018–19
