= Petar Đurin =

Croatian footballer

Personal information
- Date of birth: 4 March 2001 (age 25)
- Place of birth: Zagreb, Croatia
- Position: Goalkeeper

Team information
- Current team: Ypsonas Krasava

Youth career
- Lokomotiva
- –2018: Atalanta

Senior career*
Years	Team	Apps	(Gls)
2018–2020	Portsmouth	0	(0)
2019	→ Bognor Regis Town (loan)		
–2021	Mladost Petrinja		
2021–2022	Apollon Limassol	1	(0)
2022–	Ypsonas Krasava	10	(0)
- * Club domestic league appearances and goals as of 10 June 2024

Petar Đurin (born 4 March 2001) is a Croatian footballer who plays as a goalkeeper for Ypsonas Krasava.

== Career ==
In 2018, Đurin signed for English third division side Portsmouth from the youth academy of Atalanta in the Italian Serie A, where he said, "in Croatia, a lot is being done on explosiveness and strength. Shots are quite important, and lately it is sought after and played with the foot. In Italy a lot of attention is paid to technique and setup, and in England work is done on center shots that are sharper than anywhere I’ve been."

In 2019, he was sent on loan to English seventh division club Bognor Regis Town. In 2021, Đurin signed for Apollon Limassol in the Cypriot top flight from Croatian third division team Mladost Petrinja. On 23 August 2021, he debuted for Apollon Limassol in a 4–2 win over Ethnikos Achna.
