= 2016–17 Portsmouth F.C. season =

Portsmouth
2016–17 season
- Owner: Pompey Supporters Trust
- Chairman: Iain McInnes
- Manager: Paul Cook
- Stadium: Fratton Park
- League Two: 1st (87 points)
- FA Cup: First round
- League Cup: First round
- EFL Trophy: Group stage
- Top goalscorer: League: Kal Naismith (13); All: Kal Naismith (15)
- Highest home attendance: 18,625 vs. Plymouth Argyle (14 April 2017)
- Lowest home attendance: 15,132 vs. Blackpool (14 February 2017)
Home colours	Away colours	Third colours

The 2016–17 season was Portsmouth's fourth consecutive season in League Two. Along with competing in League Two, the club also participated in the FA Cup, League Cup and Football League Trophy. The season covers the period from 1 July 2016 to 30 June 2017.

== Players ==
=== Squad ===
As of 6 May 2017

Note: Flags indicate national team as defined under FIFA eligibility rules; some limited exceptions apply. Players may hold more than one non-FIFA nationality.

No.	Pos.	Nation	Player
1	GK	IRL	David Forde (on loan from Millwall)
2	DF	ENG	Tom Davies
3	DF	IRL	Enda Stevens
4	MF	ENG	Danny Rose
5	DF	ENG	Matt Clarke
6	DF	ENG	Christian Burgess
7	MF	ENG	Carl Baker
8	MF	IRL	Michael Doyle (captain)
11	MF	ENG	Gary Roberts
13	GK	ENG	Liam O'Brien
14	FW	ENG	Curtis Main
14	FW	ENG	Nicke Kabamba
16	DF	ENG	Jack Whatmough

No.	Pos.	Nation	Player
17	FW	IRL	Eoin Doyle (on loan from Preston North End)
18	FW	JAM	Jamal Lowe
19	FW	ENG	Conor Chaplin
20	FW	IRL	Noel Hunt
22	FW	SCO	Kal Naismith
23	FW	ENG	Kyle Bennett
24	MF	CGO	Amine Linganzi
25	DF	ENG	Drew Talbot
26	MF	ENG	Gareth Evans
29	MF	BEL	Stanley Aborah
34	GK	ENG	Nick Hall
38	DF	ENG	Brandon Haunstrup

== Transfers ==
=== In ===
No.	Pos.	Player	Transferred From	Fee	Date	Source
5	DF	(England) Matt Clarke	(England) Ipswich Town	Player Swap	1 July 2016	
4	MF	(England) Danny Rose	(England) Northampton Town	Free Transfer	1 July 2016	
7	MF	(England) Carl Baker	(England) Milton Keynes Dons	Free Transfer	1 July 2016	
25	DF	(England) Drew Talbot	(England) Chesterfield	Free Transfer	1 July 2016	
9	FW	(England) Michael Smith	(England) Swindon Town	Undisclosed	1 July 2016	
10	FW	(Slovakia) Milan Lalkovič	(England) Walsall	Undisclosed	1 July 2016	
2	DF	(England) Tom Davies	(England) Accrington Stanley	Free Transfer	1 July 2016	
14	FW	(England) Curtis Main	(England) Doncaster Rovers	Undisclosed	4 July 2016	
21	DF	(England) Adam Buxton	(England) Accrington Stanley	Free Transfer	4 August 2016	
20	FW	(Republic of Ireland) Noel Hunt	(England) Southend United	Free Transfer	4 August 2016	
24	MF	(Republic of the Congo) Amine Linganzi	(France) Fréjus	Free Transfer	8 August 2016	
13	GK	(England) Liam O'Brien	(England) Dagenham & Redbridge	Free Transfer	8 August 2016	
18	FW	(Jamaica) Jamal Lowe	(England) Hampton & Richmond	Undisclosed	13 January 2017	
15	FW	(England) Nicke Kabamba	(England) Hampton & Richmond	Undisclosed	18 January 2017	
29	MF	(Belgium) Stanley Aborah	(England) Notts County	Free Transfer	15 February 2017	

=== Out ===
No.	Pos.	Player	Transferred to	Fee	Date	Source
4	DF	(England) Adam Webster	(England) Ipswich Town	Player Swap	1 July 2016	
2	DF	(England) Ben Davies	(England) Grimsby Town	End of Contract	1 July 2016	
-	DF	(England) Chad Field	(England) Bognor Regis Town	End of Contract	1 July 2016	
40	MF	(England) Kaleem Haitham	(England) Folland Sports	End of Contract	1 July 2016	
29	MF	(England) Danny Hollands	(England) Crewe Alexandra	End of Contract	1 July 2016	
31	FW	(England) Brandon Joseph-Buadi	(England) Worthing	End of Contract	1 July 2016	
24	GK	(Republic of Ireland) Brian Murphy	(Wales) Cardiff City	End of Contract	1 July 2016	
-	DF	(Norway) Snorre Strand-Nilsen	(Norway) Gjøvik-Lyn	End of Contract	1 July 2016	
-	FW	(England) Liam Sayers	(England) Dorchester Town	End of Contract	1 July 2016	
9	FW	(England) Matt Tubbs	(England) Forest Green	Free Transfer	13 July 2016	
7	FW	(Northern Ireland) Adam McGurk	(England) Cambridge United	Undisclosed	22 July 2016	
1	GK	(England) Paul Jones	(England) Norwich City	Free Transfer	4 August 2016	
15	MF	(Republic of Ireland) Adam Barton	(Scotland) Partick Thistle	Undisclosed	31 August 2016	
21	DF	(England) Adam Buxton	(England) Tranmere Rovers	Released	31 January 2017	

=== Loaned in ===
No.	Pos.	Player	Loaned From	Until	Date	Source
1	GK	(Republic of Ireland) David Forde	(England) Millwall	End of Season	29 July 2016	
15	DF	(Scotland) Dominic Hyam	(England) Reading	6 December 2016 (Note: On 6 December, Hyam was recalled early by his parent club Reading.)	31 August 2016	
17	FW	(Republic of Ireland) Eoin Doyle	(England) Preston North End	End of Season	31 January 2017	
21	DF	(England) Aaron Simpson	(England) Wolves	23 March 2017 (Note: On 23 March, Simpson was recalled early by his parent club Wolves.)	31 January 2017	

=== Loaned out ===
No.	Pos.	Player	Loaned to	Loaned until	Date	Source
-	MF	(England) Christian Oxlade-Chamberlain	(England) Eastbourne Borough	End of Season	20 October 2016	
10	FW	(Slovakia) Milan Lalkovič	(Scotland) Ross County	End of Season	20 January 2017	
9	FW	(England) Michael Smith	(England) Northampton Town	End of Season	31 January 2017	

== Pre-season and friendlies ==
Portsmouth undertook a training camp in Ireland, playing fixtures against both Sligo Rovers and Bohemians before facing Havant & Waterlooville, Sutton United, AFC Bournemouth, Bognor Regis Town and Bristol City. A Portsmouth XI also played a behind closed doors friendly against the Liverpool Foundation at their training ground in Copnor.

6 July 2016	Sligo Rovers	3–3	Portsmouth	Sligo
18:15	Peers 70' (pen.); Sadlier 85', 88'	Report	Roberts 9'; Chaplin 17', 39'	Stadium: Showgrounds; Referee: Alan Kelly

9 July 2016	Bohemians	0–2	Portsmouth	Phibsborough
15:00		Report	Rose 33'; Chaplin 45+1'	Stadium: Dalymount Park

13 July 2016	Havant & Waterlooville	0–5	Portsmouth	Havant
19:00		Report	Roberts 12'; Baker 45', 56'; Hunt 69'; Main 73'	Stadium: West Leigh Park; Attendance: 2,300; Referee: Dean Treleaven

16 July 2016	Sutton United	2–1	Portsmouth	Sutton
15:00	Deacon 8'; Gomis 33'	Report	Oxlade-Chamberlain 81'	Stadium: Gander Green Lane; Attendance: 1,188; Referee: Craig Hicks

23 July 2016	Portsmouth	3–3	AFC Bournemouth	Portsmouth
15:00	Roberts 4'; Smith 26'; May 88'	Report	Grabban 24'; Ibe 70'; Gosling 79'	Stadium: Fratton Park; Attendance: 5,153 (531 away fans); Referee: James Linington

27 July 2016	Bognor Regis Town	1–4	Portsmouth	Bognor Regis
19:15	Whyte 48'	Report	Chaplin 27'; Main 43'; Smith 67' (pen.); May 74'	Stadium: Nyewood Lane; Attendance: 1,200; Referee: Tim Robinson

30 July 2016	Bristol City	0–0	Portsmouth	Bristol
15:00		Report		Stadium: Ashton Gate Stadium; Attendance: 5,317 (721 Pompey fans); Referee: Kevin Friend

1 August 2016	Portsmouth XI	7-0	Liverpool Foundation	Copnor
	Hunt; May; Evans; Chaplin; Tollitt; Naismith	Report		Attendance: 0 (behind closed doors)

== Competitions ==
=== Overall record ===
Competition	Starting round	Final position	Record							
Competition	Starting round	Final position	Pld	W	D	L	GF	GA	GD	Win %
EFL League Two	Matchday 1	Winners	46	26	9	11	79	40	+39	56.52
FA Cup	First round	First round	1	0	0	1	1	2	−1	0.00
EFL Cup	First round	First round	1	0	0	1	2	3	−1	0.00
EFL Trophy	Group stage	Group stage	3	1	1	1	6	6	+0	33.33
Total			51	27	10	14	88	51	+37	52.94

Last updated: 15 August 2026
Source: Soccerway

=== League Two ===
==== League table ====
Pos	Team	Pld	W	D	L	GF	GA	GD	Pts	Promotion, qualification or relegation
1	Portsmouth (C, P)	46	26	9	11	79	40	+39	87	Promotion to EFL League One
2	Plymouth Argyle (P)	46	26	9	11	71	46	+25	87	Promotion to EFL League One
3	Doncaster Rovers (P)	46	25	10	11	85	55	+30	85	Promotion to EFL League One
4	Luton Town	46	20	17	9	70	43	+27	77	Qualification for League Two play-offs (Note: Four teams play for one spot and promotion to EFL League One)
5	Exeter City	46	21	8	17	75	56	+19	71	Qualification for League Two play-offs

Updated to match(es) played on 6 May 2017. Source: BBC Sport
Rules for classification: 1) Points; 2) Goal difference; 3) Number of goals scored
(C) Champions; (P) Promoted

==== Results summary ====
Overall								Home						Away					
Pld	W	D	L	GF	GA	GD	Pts	W	D	L	GF	GA	GD	W	D	L	GF	GA	GD
46	26	9	11	79	40	+39	87	14	4	5	48	19	+29	12	5	6	31	21	+10

Last updated: 6 May 2017.
Source: BBC

==== Results by matchday ====
Matchday	1	2	3	4	5	6	7	8	9	10	11	12	13	14	15	16	17	18	19	20	21	22	23	24	25	26	27	28	29	30	31	32	33	34	35	36	37	38	39	40	41	42	43	44	45	46
Ground	H	A	A	H	A	H	H	A	H	A	H	A	A	H	A	H	A	A	H	A	H	A	A	H	A	H	H	A	H	H	A	A	H	H	A	A	H	A	H	A	H	H	A	H	A	H
Result	D	D	L	W	W	W	W	L	W	L	L	W	D	L	W	W	D	W	L	W	D	W	D	W	L	W	L	L	W	W	D	W	D	L	W	W	W	L	W	W	W	D	W	W	W	W
Position	16	17	20	14	8	4	2	5	2	4	7	4	5	5	5	4	5	4	4	4	4	4	4	4	4	4	3	4	5	4	4	4	3	3	3	3	3	3	3	3	3	3	3	3	3	1

Updated to match(es) played on 6 May 2017. Source: 11v11
A = Away; H = Home; W = Win; D = Draw; L = Loss

==== Matches ====
On 22 June 2016, the League Two fixtures for the forthcoming season were announced.

6 August 2016 1	Portsmouth	1–1	Carlisle United	Portsmouth
15:00 BST	Baker 42'	Report	Lambe 14'; Devitt (red card) 28'; Gillespie (yellow card) 73'	Stadium: Fratton Park; Attendance: 17,570 (481 away fans); Referee: Graham Salisbury

13 August 2016 2	Crewe Alexandra	0–0	Portsmouth	Crewe
15:00 BST	Dagnall (yellow card) 89'	Report	Naismith (yellow card) 84'	Stadium: Gresty Road; Attendance: 4,742 (1,257 Pompey fans); Referee: Dean Whitestone

16 August 2016 3	Morecambe	2–0	Portsmouth	Morecambe
19:45 BST	Edwards 10'; Barkhuizen 21'	Report		Stadium: Globe Arena; Attendance: 1,838; Referee: Nigel Miller

20 August 2016 4	Portsmouth	2–0	Colchester United	Portsmouth
15:00 BST	Doyle (yellow card) 29'; Roberts 79' (pen.), 84'	Report	Guthrie (yellow card) 17'; Kinsella (yellow card) 27'	Stadium: Fratton Park; Attendance: 15,967 (442 away fans); Referee: Charles Breakspear

27 August 2016 5	Exeter City	0–1	Portsmouth	Exeter
15:00 BST	Harley (yellow card) 25'; Sweeney (yellow card) 85'; Riley-Lowe (yellow card) 90'	Report	Roberts 85' (pen.)	Stadium: St James Park; Attendance: 4,512; Referee: Gavin Ward

3 September 2016 6	Portsmouth	3–0	Crawley Town	Portsmouth
15:00 BST	Main 9', 37' (yellow card) 33'; Roberts 12'; Davies (yellow card) 63'	Report	Blackman (yellow card) 30'	Stadium: Fratton Park; Attendance: 16,347; Referee: Ben Toner

10 September 2016 7	Portsmouth	4–2	Wycombe Wanderers	Portsmouth
15:00 BST	Roberts (yellow card) 28', (goal) 45' (pen.); Burgess 34'; Chaplin 45+4'; Baker 53' (yellow card) 72'	Report	Hayes 10', 45+1'; Pierre (yellow card) 28'; Sido Jombati (yellow card) 42'; Thompson (yellow card) 45+6'; Gape (yellow card) 61'; Harriman (yellow card) 65'; Blackman (yellow card) 72'; Stewart (yellow card) 90+1'	Stadium: Fratton Park; Attendance: 16,262 (489 away fans); Referee: Tim Robinson

17 September 2016 8	Accrington Stanley	1–0	Portsmouth	Accrington
15:00 BST	McConville (yellow card) 46'; Lacey 52'	Report	Davies (yellow card) 86'	Stadium: Wham Stadium; Attendance: 2,461 (806 Pompey fans); Referee: Mark Haywood

24 September 2016 9	Portsmouth	5–1	Barnet	Portsmouth
15:00 BST	Chaplin 34' (yellow card) 72'; Roberts 50' (penalty missed) (yellow card) 88'; Baker 56'; Lalkovič 78'; Rose 90+2'	Report	Akinde 27' (pen.); Watson (yellow card) 29'; Batt (yellow card) 59'; Dembélé (red card) 64'	Stadium: Fratton Park; Attendance: 16,280; Referee: Darren England

27 September 2016 10	Blackpool	3–1	Portsmouth	Blackpool
19:45 BST	Mellor 18'; Potts 49'; Vassell 65'; Gnanduillet (yellow card) 76'	Report	Chaplin 34'; Bennett (yellow card) 70'; Doyle (yellow card) 86'	Stadium: Bloomfield Road; Attendance: 3,055; Referee: David Webb

1 October 2016 11	Portsmouth	1–2	Doncaster Rovers	Portsmouth
15:00 BST	Evans (yellow card) 36'; Baker 41'	Report	Marquis 7' (yellow card) 90'; Williams 34'; Butler (yellow card) 58'; Evina (yellow card) 88'	Stadium: Fratton Park; Attendance: 16,950; Referee: Darren Deadman

8 October 2016 12	Leyton Orient	0–1	Portsmouth	Leyton, London
15:00 BST		Report	Bennett (yellow card) 30'; Stevens (yellow card) 34'; Burgess 57'	Stadium: Matchroom Stadium; Attendance: 6,078; Referee: Chris Sarginson

15 October 2016 13	Plymouth Argyle	2–2	Portsmouth	Plymouth
15:00 BST	Songo'o 21' (yellow card) 21'; Purrington (yellow card) 34'; Slew (yellow card) 43'; Smith 89'	Report	Chaplin (yellow card) 27'; Bennett 40'; Evans (yellow card) 45+1'; Rose 86'	Stadium: Home Park; Attendance: 13,508; Referee: Darren Handley

22 October 2016 14	Portsmouth	1–2	Notts County	Portsmouth
15:00 BST	Chaplin 27'; Doyle (yellow card) 74'	Report	Campbell 21', 71'; Laing (yellow card) 48'; Collins (red card) 77'	Stadium: Fratton Park; Attendance: 17,269; Referee: Nigel Miller

29 October 2016 15	Cambridge United	0–1	Portsmouth	Cambridge
15:00 BST	Dunne (yellow card) 25'; Halliday (yellow card) 80'; Ikpeazu (yellow card) 85'	Report	Chaplin 24' (yellow card) 39'; Linganzi (red card) 61'; Doyle (yellow card) 77'; Hunt (yellow card) 90+1'; Roberts (yellow card) 90+4'	Stadium: The R Costings Abbey Stadium; Attendance: 6,397; Referee: Ross Joyce

12 November 2016 16	Portsmouth	4–0	Mansfield Town	Portsmouth
15:00 GMT	Roberts 11' (pen.); Baker (yellow card) 48' (goal) 88', 90+5'; Chaplin (yellow card) 81'; Hunt 84'	Report	Howkins (yellow card) 53' (yellow-red card) 57'; Iacovitti (red card) 74'	Stadium: Fratton Park; Attendance: 16,393; Referee: Roger East

19 November 2016 17	Cheltenham Town	1–1	Portsmouth	Cheltenham
15:00 GMT	Pell (yellow card) 7'; Downes (yellow card) 11'; O'Shaughnessy 65'	Report	Chaplin (yellow card) 52'; Burgess (yellow card) 64'; Baker (yellow card) 78'; Smith 82'	Stadium: LCI Rail Stadium; Attendance: 4,702; Referee: John Brooks

22 November 2016 18	Luton Town	1–3	Portsmouth	Luton
19:45 GMT	Hylton 7'; Lee (yellow card) 64'; Sheehan (yellow card) 65'	Report	Smith 11'; Evans (yellow card) 17' (goal) 45+2'; Stevens (yellow card) 49'; Rose (yellow card) 60'; Naismith 85'; Hunt (yellow card) 90+6'	Stadium: Kenilworth Road Stadium; Attendance: 8,805; Referee: David Coote

26 November 2016 19	Portsmouth	1–2	Stevenage	Portsmouth
15:00 GMT	Clarke (yellow card) 73'; Smith 80'; Evans (yellow card) 90+1'	Report	Gorman (yellow card) 39'; Wilkinson (yellow card) 45'; Schumacher 71'; Godden 75'; King (yellow card) 90+4'	Stadium: Fratton Park; Attendance: 15,987; Referee: Ben Toner

10 December 2016 20	Grimsby Town	0–1	Portsmouth	Cleethorpes
15:00 GMT	Gowling (yellow card) 51'; Berrett (yellow card) 85'	Report	Stevens (yellow card) 82'; Naismith 86'; Evans (yellow card) 90+3'	Stadium: Blundell Park; Attendance: 6,560; Referee: Andy Haines

17 December 2016 21	Portsmouth	0–0	Hartlepool United	Portsmouth
15:00 GMT	Baker (yellow card) 66'; Doyle (yellow card) 68'	Report	Donnelly (yellow card) 76'; Featherstone (yellow card) 90+9'	Stadium: Fratton Park; Attendance: 17,081; Referee: Graham Horwood

26 December 2016 22	Newport County	2–3	Portsmouth	Newport
15:00 GMT	Healey (yellow card) 7' (goal) 51'; Sheehan 25'; Tozer (yellow card) 39'; Barnum-Bobb (yellow card) 79'	Report	Burgess (yellow card) 51'; Rose 56'; Naismith (penalty missed) 62' 87'; Hunt (yellow card) 73'; Stevens 80'	Stadium: Rodney Parade; Attendance: 3,714; Referee: Charles Breakspear

30 December 2016 23	Yeovil Town	0–0	Portsmouth	Yeovil
19:45 GMT		Report		Stadium: Huish Park Stadium; Attendance: 6,306; Referee: Chris Sarginson

2 January 2017 24	Portsmouth	1–0	Luton Town	Portsmouth
15:00 GMT	Burgess 31'; Forde (yellow card) 87'; Roberts (penalty missed) 90+2'; Hunt (yellow card) 90+4'	Report	McGeehan (yellow card) 16'; Smith (yellow card) 38'; Vassell (yellow card) 66'; Ruddock Mpanzu (yellow card) 90+4'	Stadium: Fratton Park; Attendance: 17,402; Referee: Tim Robinson

5 January 2017 25	Doncaster Rovers	3–1	Portsmouth	Doncaster
19:45 GMT	Marquis 5', 72'; Alcock (yellow card) 52'; Rowe 58'	Report	Burgess (yellow card) 34'; Evans (yellow card) 40'; Naismith 41'; Doyle (yellow card) 45+1'	Stadium: The Keepmoat Stadium; Attendance: 5,568; Referee: Jeremy Simpson

14 January 2017 26	Portsmouth	2–1	Leyton Orient	Portsmouth
15:00 GMT	Chaplin (penalty missed) 21' 22', 47'; Doyle (yellow card) 72'	Report	Atangana (yellow card) 26'; Massey 37'	Stadium: Fratton Park; Attendance: 16,564; Referee: Brett Huxtable

28 January 2017 27	Portsmouth	0–1	Exeter City	Portsmouth
15:00 GMT	Clarke (yellow card) 68'; Forde (yellow card) 79'	Report	Wheeler 57'; Reid (yellow card) 78'	Stadium: Fratton Park; Attendance: 17,195; Referee: Dean Whitestone

4 February 2017 28	Wycombe Wanderers	1–0	Portsmouth	High Wycombe
15:00 GMT	Stewart (yellow card) 11'; Kashket 48' (yellow card) 88'; Wood (yellow card) 66'; Saunders (yellow card) 82'	Report	Stevens (yellow card) 42'	Stadium: Adams Park; Attendance: 6,028; Referee: Graham Salisbury

11 February 2017 29	Portsmouth	2–0	Accrington Stanley	Portsmouth
15:00 GMT	Clarke 2'; Doyle (yellow card) 41'; Naismith 90+2'	Report	Conneely (yellow card) 56'; Donacien (yellow card) 79'	Stadium: Fratton Park; Attendance: 15955; Referee: Gavin Ward

14 February 2017 30	Portsmouth	2–0	Blackpool	Portsmouth
19:45 GMT	Burgess (yellow card) 11'; Evans 27'; Roberts (yellow card) 36'; Bennett (yellow card) 81'; Doyle 90+5'	Report	Mellor (yellow card) 21'	Stadium: Fratton Park; Attendance: 15,132; Referee: Darren Deadman

18 February 2017 31	Barnet	1–1	Portsmouth	Canons Park, London
15:00 GMT	Vilhete 82'	Report	Roberts (yellow card) 68'; Chaplin 89'	Stadium: The Hive Stadium; Attendance: 4,571; Referee: Mark Brown

25 February 2017 32	Carlisle United	0–3	Portsmouth	Carlisle
15:00 GMT	O'Sullivan (yellow card) 40'; Miller (yellow card) 61'	Report	Roberts 73'; Linganzi 86'; Whatmough 90+2'	Stadium: Brunton Park; Attendance: 7,197; Referee: Richard Clark

28 February 2017 33	Portsmouth	1–1	Morecambe	Portsmouth
19:45 GMT	Naismith 64'; Roberts (yellow card) 76'	Report	Molyneux 83'; Rose (yellow card) 90'	Stadium: Fratton Park; Attendance: 15,592; Referee: Stephen Martin

4 March 2017 34	Portsmouth	0–1	Crewe Alexandra	Portsmouth
15:00 GMT	Evans (yellow card) 70'	Report	Jones (yellow card) 58'; Ray 77'	Stadium: Fratton Park; Attendance: 16,810; Referee: John Busby

7 March 2017 35	Crawley Town	0–2	Portsmouth	Crawley
19:45 GMT	Young (yellow card) 38'	Report	Burgess 54'; Bennett 71'; Hunt (yellow card) 72'; Doyle (yellow card) 90+4'	Stadium: Broadfield Stadium; Attendance: 5,350; Referee: Kevin Johnson

11 March 2017 36	Colchester United	0–4	Portsmouth	Colchester
15:00 GMT	James (yellow card) 63'	Report	E. Doyle 22'; Bennett 46'; Rose 61'; M. Doyle 74'	Stadium: Colchester Community Stadium; Attendance: 6,504; Referee: Darren England

14 March 2017 37	Portsmouth	4–0	Grimsby Town	Portsmouth
19:45 GMT	Bennett 12'; Rose 35'; Baker 45+1'; Naismith 47'	Report		Stadium: Fratton Park; Attendance: 16,492; Referee: Robert Jones

18 March 2017 38	Stevenage	3–0	Portsmouth	Stevenage
15:00 GMT	King 16'; Godden 28'; Wilkinson (yellow card) 34'; Pett (yellow card) 45'; McAnuff 46'; Gorman (yellow card) 85'; Franks (yellow card) 86'	Report	Stevens (yellow card) 27'; Burgess (yellow card) 31' (yellow-red card) 75'; Baker (yellow card) 54'	Stadium: Broadhall Way; Attendance: 4,185; Referee: Michael Salisbury

25 March 2017 39	Portsmouth	2–1	Newport County	Portsmouth
15:00 GMT	Bennett 42'; Naismith 59'	Report	Rigg (yellow card) 52'; Labadie (yellow card) 69'; Samuel 77'; Myrie-Williams (yellow card) 88'	Stadium: Fratton Park; Attendance: 17,364; Referee: Tim Robinson

1 April 2017 40	Hartlepool United	0–2	Portsmouth	Hartlepool
15:00 GMT	Alessandra (yellow card) 4'	Report	Naismith 17'; Roberts 60'; Rose (yellow card) 88'	Stadium: Victoria Park; Attendance: 4,500; Referee: Mark Brown

8 April 2017 41	Portsmouth	3–1	Yeovil Town	Portsmouth
15:00 BST	Evans 15' (pen.); Naismith 68'; Lowe 78'	Report	Zoko 51'	Stadium: Fratton Park; Attendance: 17,564; Referee: Graham Horwood

14 April 2017 42	Portsmouth	1–1	Plymouth Argyle	Portsmouth
14:30 BST	Naismith (yellow card) 35'; Roberts 57'	Report	Jervis 12'; Sarcevic (yellow card) 60'; Threlkeld (yellow card) 90+2'	Stadium: Fratton Park; Attendance: 18,625; Referee: Chris Sarginson

17 April 2017 43	Notts County	1–3	Portsmouth	Nottingham
15:00 BST	O'Connor (yellow card) 30'; Grant 51'; Bola (yellow card) 90+1'	Report	Evans 14' (pen.); Linganzi (yellow card) 60'; Lowe 77', 90'; Chaplin (yellow card) 78'; Naismith (yellow card) 90+3'	Stadium: Meadow Lane; Attendance: 12,184; Referee: Graham Salisbury

22 April 2017 44	Portsmouth	2–1	Cambridge United	Portsmouth
15:00 BST	Baker (yellow card) 9' (goal) 20'; Naismith 51'; Whatmough (yellow card) 90+3'; Forde (yellow card) 90+5'	Report	O'Neil (yellow card) 53'; Berry 80'	Stadium: Fratton Park; Attendance: 18,165; Referee: Gavin Ward

29 April 2017 45	Mansfield Town	0–1	Portsmouth	Mansfield
15:00 BST	White (yellow card) 28'; Whiteman (yellow card) 60'; Bennett (yellow card) 90+5'; Pearce (yellow card) 90+7'	Report	Baker (yellow card) 11' (goal) 56'; Clarke (yellow card) 48'; Stevens (yellow card) 59'; Bennett (yellow card) 60'; Aborah (yellow card) 83'	Stadium: Field Mill; Attendance: 6,819; Referee: Lee Swabey

6 May 2017 46	Portsmouth	6–1	Cheltenham Town	Portsmouth
15:00 BST	O'Shaughnessy 13' (o.g.); Stevens (yellow card) 50'; Bennett 62' Naismith 66', 84'; Lowe 72'; Evans 75' (pen.)	Report	(yellow card) 29' Storer; 77' Dayton	Stadium: Fratton Park; Attendance: 17,956; Referee: Chris Sarginson

=== FA Cup ===
The first round draw took place on 17 October and was broadcast live on BBC Two and BT Sport.

5 November 2016 First round	Portsmouth	1–2	Wycombe Wanderers	Portsmouth
15:00 GMT	Close (yellow card) 43'; Evans 47'	Report	Cowan-Hall 27'; O'Nien (yellow card) 70'; Akinfenwa 84'	Stadium: Fratton Park; Attendance: 8,130; Referee: Gavin Ward

=== EFL Cup ===
The first round draw took place on the 22 June 2016. The draw for this round was split on a geographical basis into 'northern' and 'southern' sections. Teams were drawn against a team from the same section.

9 August 2016 First round	Coventry City	3–2 (a.e.t.)	Portsmouth	Coventry
19:45 BST	Gadzhev (yellow card) 20' (goal) 82'; Haynes 60'; Stevenson (yellow card) 83'; Rose 106'; Lameiras (yellow card) 120+1'	Report	Main 20' (pen.); Naismith 85' (yellow card) 86'	Stadium: Ricoh Arena; Attendance: 4,976 (722 Pompey fans); Referee: Andrew Madley

=== EFL Trophy ===
On 9 June 2016, the newly rebranded EFL announced that the 2016–17 EFL Trophy competition would include sixteen "category 1 Premier League academy sides" for the first time. The first knockout round would also be replaced with a new group stage, the sixteen regional groups each to comprise three League One/Two teams plus an academy side, with the top two teams from each group progressing to the knockout second round.

Pos	Div	Team	Pld	W	PW	PL	L	GF	GA	GD	Pts	Qualification
1	L2	Yeovil Town	3	2	0	1	0	6	3	+3	7	Advance to Round 2
2	ACA	Reading U21	3	1	1	0	1	5	6	−1	5	Advance to Round 2
3	L2	Portsmouth	3	1	0	1	1	6	6	0	4	
4	L1	Bristol Rovers	3	0	1	0	2	2	4	−2	2	

Source: Sky Sports

30 August 2016 Group stage 1	Yeovil Town	4–3	Portsmouth	Yeovil
19:45 BST	Dolan 13'; Eaves 22', 39'; McLeod 27'; Shephard (yellow card) 45+2'; Khan (yellow card) 60'	Report	Barton (yellow card) 4'; Smith 10', 37', 55'; Close (yellow card) 65'	Stadium: Huish Park

4 October 2016 Group stage 2	Portsmouth	2–2 (3–4 p)	Reading U23	Portsmouth
19:45 BST	Main 57', 63'	Report	Novakovich 6'; Mendes 52' (pen.); Rinomhota (yellow card) 78'	Stadium: Fratton Park; Attendance: 1,355; Referee: Oliver Langford
	Penalties
	Smith (penalty scored); Naismith (penalty scored); Bennett (penalty missed); Lalkovič (penalty missed); Evans (penalty scored); May (penalty missed); Whatmough (penalty missed)		Mendes (penalty scored); Blackett (penalty scored); Gravenberch (penalty scored); Samuel (penalty missed); Griffin (penalty missed); Watson (penalty missed); Frost (penalty scored)

8 November 2016 Group stage 3	Portsmouth	1–0	Bristol Rovers	Portsmouth
19:45 GMT	Smith (penalty missed) 6'; Bennett (yellow card) 37'; Davies (yellow card) 59'; Naismith 88'	Report	Mansell (yellow card) 56'; McChrystal (yellow card) 72'	Stadium: Fratton Park; Attendance: 1,200; Referee: Nick Kinseley

== Statistics ==
=== Appearances and goals ===
As of match(es) played 6 May 2017

Players with no appearances are not included on the list
Italics indicate a loaned in player

No.	Pos	Nat	Player	Total		League Two		FA Cup		EFL Cup		EFL Trophy	
No.	Pos	Nat	Player	Apps	Goals	Apps	Goals	Apps	Goals	Apps	Goals	Apps	Goals
1	GK	(Republic of Ireland) IRL	David Forde	47	0	46+0	0	1+0	0	0+0	0	0+0	0
2	DF	(England) ENG	Tom Davies	15	0	10+2	0	0+0	0	1+0	0	1+1	0
3	DF	(Republic of Ireland) IRL	Enda Stevens	46	1	45+0	1	1+0	0	0+0	0	0+0	0
4	MF	(England) ENG	Danny Rose	40	5	33+5	5	1+0	0	0+0	0	0+1	0
5	DF	(England) ENG	Matt Clarke	36	1	33+0	1	1+0	0	0+0	0	2+0	0
6	DF	(England) ENG	Christian Burgess	45	4	44+0	4	1+0	0	0+0	0	0+0	0
7	MF	(England) ENG	Carl Baker	46	9	40+5	9	0+1	0	0+0	0	0+0	0
8	MF	(Republic of Ireland) IRL	Michael Doyle	46	1	46+0	1	0+0	0	0+0	0	0+0	0
9	FW	(England) ENG	Michael Smith	21	6	14+4	3	0+0	0	0+0	0	3+0	3
10	FW	(Slovakia) SVK	Milan Lalkovič	16	1	5+8	1	1+0	0	0+0	0	2+0	0
11	MF	(England) ENG	Gary Roberts	42	10	31+10	10	1+0	0	0+0	0	0+0	0
13	GK	(England) ENG	Liam O'Brien	3	0	0+0	0	0+0	0	0+0	0	3+0	0
14	FW	(England) ENG	Curtis Main	14	5	4+8	2	0+0	0	1+0	1	1+0	2
15	FW	(England) ENG	Nicke Kabamba	4	0	1+3	0	0+0	0	0+0	0	0+0	0
16	DF	(England) ENG	Jack Whatmough	12	1	4+6	1	0+0	0	0+0	0	2+0	0
17	FW	(Republic of Ireland) IRL	Eoin Doyle	12	2	12+0	2	0+0	0	0+0	0	0+0	0
18	FW	(Jamaica) JAM	Jamal Lowe	14	4	5+9	4	0+0	0	0+0	0	0+0	0
19	FW	(England) ENG	Conor Chaplin	42	8	13+26	8	0+1	0	0+1	0	0+1	0
20	FW	(Republic of Ireland) IRL	Noel Hunt	24	1	4+16	1	1+0	0	0+1	0	0+2	0
22	FW	(Scotland) SCO	Kal Naismith	41	15	22+15	13	0+0	0	1+0	1	2+1	1
23	FW	(England) ENG	Kyle Bennett	44	6	33+6	6	0+1	0	1+0	0	3+0	0
24	MF	(Republic of the Congo) CGO	Amine Linganzi	23	1	12+7	1	0+0	0	1+0	0	3+0	0
25	DF	(England) ENG	Drew Talbot	7	0	5+0	0	0+0	0	0+1	0	1+0	0
26	MF	(England) ENG	Gareth Evans	46	6	41+0	5	1+0	1	1+0	0	1+2	0
29	MF	(Belgium) BEL	Stanley Aborah	4	0	1+3	0	0+0	0	0+0	0	0+0	0
30	MF	(England) ENG	Adam May	3	0	0+0	0	0+0	0	1+0	0	1+1	0
33	MF	(England) ENG	Ben Close	4	0	0+0	0	1+0	0	0+0	0	3+0	0
35	GK	(England) ENG	Alex Bass	1	0	0+0	0	0+0	0	1+0	0	0+0	0
38	DF	(England) ENG	Brandon Haunstrup	1	0	0+0	0	0+0	0	0+0	0	1+0	0
Player(s) who featured but departed permanently during the season:
18	MF	(England) ENG	Ben Tollitt	2	0	0+0	0	0+0	0	1+0	0	1+0	0
15	MF	(Northern Ireland) NIR	Adam Barton	5	0	2+1	0	0+0	0	1+0	0	1+0	0
21	DF	(England) ENG	Adam Buxton	4	0	0+0	0	1+0	0	1+0	0	2+0	0

=== Disciplinary record ===
As of match(es) played 6 May 2017

Players with no cards are not included on the list
Italics indicate a loaned in player

No.	Pos	Nat	Player	Total		League Two		FA Cup		EFL Cup		EFL Trophy	
No.	Pos	Nat	Player	Yellow card	Red card	Yellow card	Red card	Yellow card	Red card	Yellow card	Red card	Yellow card	Red card
1	GK	(Republic of Ireland) IRL	David Forde	3	0	3	0	0	0	0	0	0	0
2	DF	(England) ENG	Tom Davies	2	0	2	0	0	0	0	0	0	0
3	DF	(Republic of Ireland) IRL	Enda Stevens	8	0	8	0	0	0	0	0	0	0
4	MF	(England) ENG	Danny Rose	2	0	2	0	0	0	0	0	0	0
5	DF	(England) ENG	Matt Clarke	3	0	3	0	0	0	0	0	0	0
6	DF	(England) ENG	Christian Burgess	5	1	5	1	0	0	0	0	0	0
7	MF	(England) ENG	Carl Baker	7	0	7	0	0	0	0	0	0	0
8	MF	(Republic of Ireland) IRL	Michael Doyle	8	0	8	0	0	0	0	0	0	0
11	MF	(England) ENG	Gary Roberts	6	0	6	0	0	0	0	0	0	0
14	FW	(England) ENG	Curtis Main	1	0	1	0	0	0	0	0	0	0
16	DF	(England) ENG	Jack Whatmough	1	0	1	0	0	0	0	0	0	0
17	FW	(Republic of Ireland) IRL	Eoin Doyle	2	0	2	0	0	0	0	0	0	0
19	FW	(England) ENG	Conor Chaplin	6	0	6	0	0	0	0	0	0	0
20	FW	(Republic of Ireland) IRL	Noel Hunt	5	0	5	0	0	0	0	0	0	0
22	FW	(Scotland) SCO	Kal Naismith	4	0	3	0	0	0	1	0	0	0
23	FW	(England) ENG	Kyle Bennett	4	0	4	0	0	0	0	0	0	0
24	MF	(Republic of the Congo) CGO	Amine Linganzi	1	1	1	1	0	0	0	0	0	0
26	MF	(England) ENG	Gareth Evans	7	0	7	0	0	0	0	0	0	0
29	MF	(Belgium) BEL	Stanley Aborah	1	0	1	0	0	0	0	0	0	0
33	MF	(England) ENG	Ben Close	2	0	0	0	1	0	0	0	1	0
Player(s) who featured but departed permanently during the season:
15	MF	(Northern Ireland) NIR	Adam Barton	1	0	0	0	0	0	0	0	1	0
Squad Total				79	2	75	2	1	0	1	0	2	0
