= 2017–18 Portsmouth F.C. season =

Portsmouth
2017–18 season
- Chairman: Michael Eisner
- Manager: Kenny Jackett
- Stadium: Fratton Park
- League One: 8th (66 points)
- FA Cup: First round
- EFL Cup: First round
- EFL Trophy: Third round
- Top goalscorer: League: Brett Pitman (18); All: Brett Pitman (19)
- Highest home attendance: 19,210 vs. Charlton Athletic (21 April 2018)
- Lowest home attendance: 17,118 vs. Rotherham Utd (3 September 2017)
Home colours	Away colours	Third colours

The 2017–18 season was Portsmouth's first back in League One following their promotion as champions last season. Along with competing in League One, the club participated in the FA Cup, EFL Cup and EFL Trophy. The season covers the period from 1 July 2017 to 30 June 2018.

== Players ==
=== Squad ===
As of 5 May 2018

Note: Flags indicate national team as defined under FIFA eligibility rules; some limited exceptions apply. Players may hold more than one non-FIFA nationality.

No.	Pos.	Nation	Player
1	GK	ENG	Luke McGee
2	DF	ENG	Anton Walkes (on loan from Tottenham Hotspur)
3	DF	ENG	Tareiq Holmes-Dennis (on loan from Huddersfield Town)
4	MF	ENG	Danny Rose
5	DF	ENG	Matt Clarke
6	DF	ENG	Christian Burgess
7	MF	ENG	Stuart O'Keefe (on loan from Cardiff City)
8	FW	Jersey	Brett Pitman (captain)
9	FW	ENG	Oliver Hawkins
11	FW	NIR	Matty Kennedy (on loan from Cardiff City)
13	GK	IRL	Stephen Henderson (on loan from Nottingham Forest)
14	MF	IRL	Connor Ronan (on loan from Wolverhampton Wanderers)
16	DF	ENG	Jack Whatmough

No.	Pos.	Nation	Player
17	MF	WAL	Dion Donohue
18	FW	JAM	Jamal Lowe
19	FW	ENG	Conor Chaplin
20	DF	ENG	Nathan Thompson
22	FW	SCO	Kal Naismith
26	MF	ENG	Gareth Evans
29	DF	FRA	Sylvain Deslandes (on loan from Wolverhampton Wanderers)
30	MF	ENG	Adam May
32	MF	ENG	Christian Oxlade-Chamberlain
33	MF	ENG	Ben Close
35	GK	ENG	Alex Bass
36	MF	ENG	Jez Bedford
37	MF	ENG	Theo Widdrington
38	DF	ENG	Brandon Haunstrup

== Transfers ==
=== In ===
No.	Pos.	Player	Transferred From	Fee	Date	Source
20	DF	(England) Nathan Thompson	(England) Swindon Town	Free Transfer	1 July 2017	
1	GK	(England) Luke McGee	(England) Tottenham Hotspur	Undisclosed	12 July 2017	
8	FW	(Jersey) Brett Pitman	(England) Ipswich Town	Undisclosed	14 July 2017	
17	MF	(Wales) Dion Donohue	(England) Chesterfield	Undisclosed	18 August 2017	
9	MF	(England) Oliver Hawkins	(England) Dagenham & Redbridge	Undisclosed	31 August 2017	

=== Out ===
No.	Pos.	Player	Transferred to	Fee	Date	Source
29	MF	(Belgium) Stanley Aborah	(Republic of Ireland) Waterford	End of Contract	1 July 2017	
31	DF	(England) Calvin Davies	(England) Bognor Regis	End of Contract	1 July 2017	
8	MF	(Republic of Ireland) Michael Doyle	(England) Coventry City	End of Contract	1 July 2017	
20	FW	(Republic of Ireland) Noel Hunt	(England) Wigan Athletic	End of Contract	1 July 2017	
24	MF	(Republic of the Congo) Amine Linganzi	(England) Swindon Town	End of Contract	1 July 2017	
13	GK	(England) Liam O'Brien	(England) Coventry City	End of Contract	1 July 2017	
3	DF	(Republic of Ireland) Enda Stevens	(England) Sheffield United	End of Contract	1 July 2017	
-	FW	(England) Harvey Bradbury	(England) Watford	Free Transfer	8 July 2017	
11	MF	(England) Gary Roberts	(England) Wigan Athletic	Mutual Consent	8 August 2017	
7	MF	(England) Carl Baker	(India) ATK	Mutual Consent	31 August 2017	
2	DF	(England) Tom Davies	(England) Coventry City	Undisclosed	31 August 2017	
9	FW	(England) Michael Smith	(England) Bury	Mutual Consent	31 August 2017	
25	DF	(England) Drew Talbot	(England) Chesterfield	Mutual Consent	19 December 2017	
14	FW	(England) Curtis Main	(Scotland) Motherwell	Free Transfer	3 January 2018	
10	FW	(Slovakia) Milan Lalkovič	Unattached	Mutual Consent	31 January 2018	
23	FW	(England) Kyle Bennett	(England) Bristol Rovers	Free Transfer	31 January 2018	

=== Loaned in ===
No.	Pos.	Player	Loaned From	Until	Date	Source
3	DF	(England) Tareiq Holmes-Dennis	(England) Huddersfield Town	End of Season	5 July 2017	
2	DF	(Republic of Ireland) Damien McCrory	(England) Burton Albion	1 January 2018	31 August 2017	
7	MF	(England) Stuart O'Keefe	(Wales) Cardiff City	End of Season	31 August 2017	
11	FW	(Northern Ireland) Matty Kennedy	(Wales) Cardiff City	End of Season	31 August 2017	
29	DF	(France) Sylvain Deslandes	(England) Wolves	End of Season	3 January 2018	
14	MF	(Republic of Ireland) Connor Ronan	(England) Wolves	End of Season	3 January 2018	
2	DF	(England) Anton Walkes	(England) Tottenham Hotspur	End of Season	29 January 2018	
13	GK	(Republic of Ireland) Stephen Henderson	(England) Nottingham Forest	End of Season	31 January 2018	

=== Loaned out ===
No.	Pos.	Player	Loaned to	Until	Date	Source
32	MF	(England) Christian Oxlade-Chamberlain	(England) Poole Town	3 September 2017	5 August 2017	
36	MF	(England) Jez Bedford	(England) Poole Town	3 September 2017	5 August 2017	
15	FW	(England) Nicke Kabamba	(England) Colchester United	1 January 2018	31 August 2017	
32	MF	(England) Christian Oxlade-Chamberlain	(England) Oxford City	5 October 2017	4 September 2017	
15	FW	(England) Nicke Kabamba	(England) Aldershot Town	End of Season	5 January 2018	

== Pre-season and friendlies ==
As of 22 June 2017, Portsmouth have announced five pre-season friendlies against Salisbury, Eastleigh, Havant & Waterlooville, AFC Bournemouth and Crawley Town.

On 19 June 2017, A joint decision was made to cancel the scheduled friendly against Cardiff City as the clubs were drawn together in the first round of the EFL Cup.

1 July 2017	Salisbury	0–3	Portsmouth	Old Sarum
15:00 BST		Report	Lalkovič 57'; Davies 63'; Close 75'	Stadium: The Raymond McEnhill Stadium; Attendance: 1,766

8 July 2017	Havant & Waterlooville	0–6	Portsmouth	Havant
15:00 BST		Report	Molyneaux 26' (o.g.); Chaplin 30', 39', 45+1'; Naismith 47'; Main 74' (pen.)	Stadium: Westleigh Park; Attendance: 2,700; Referee: Alex Blake

11 July 2017	Poole Town	3–6	Portsmouth	Poole
19:30 BST	Balmer 4'; Burbidge 7'; Roberts 65'	Report	Kabamba 15', 89'; Close 30', 68'; Main 59', 70' (pen.)	Stadium: Tatnam Ground; Attendance: 407; Referee: Gary Parsons

15 July 2017	Eastleigh	P–P	Portsmouth	Eastleigh
15:00 BST				Stadium: Ten Acres

15 July 2017	Bognor Regis Town	0–2	Portsmouth	Bognor Regis
15:00 BST		Report	Pitman 5', 86'	Stadium: Nyewood Lane; Referee: Gary Parsons

22 July 2017	Portsmouth	1–2	AFC Bournemouth	Milton
15:00 BST	Chaplin 52'	Report	Mousset 9'; Afobe 54'	Stadium: Fratton Park; Attendance: 7,182; Referee: Andy Davies

29 July 2017	Crawley Town	1–2	Portsmouth	Crawley
15:00 BST	Verheydt 3'	Report	Pitman 55', 75'	Stadium: Checkatrade.com Stadium; Attendance: 1,603; Referee: Carl Brook

== Competitions ==
=== Overall record ===
Competition	Starting round	Final position	Record							
Competition	Starting round	Final position	Pld	W	D	L	GF	GA	GD	Win %
EFL League One	Matchday 1	8th	46	20	6	20	57	56	+1	43.48
FA Cup	First round	First round	1	0	0	1	0	1	−1	0.00
EFL Cup	First round	First round	1	0	0	1	1	2	−1	0.00
EFL Trophy	Group stage	Third Round	5	3	1	1	10	6	+4	60.00
Total			53	23	7	23	68	65	+3	43.40

Last updated: 15 August 2026
Source: Soccerway

=== League One ===
==== League table ====
Pos	Team	Pld	W	D	L	GF	GA	GD	Pts	Promotion, qualification or relegation
6	Charlton Athletic	46	20	11	15	58	51	+7	71	Qualification for League One play-offs (Note: Four teams play for one spot and promotion to the EFL Championship.)
7	Plymouth Argyle	46	19	11	16	58	59	−1	68	
8	Portsmouth	46	20	6	20	57	56	+1	66	
9	Peterborough United	46	17	13	16	68	60	+8	64	
10	Southend United	46	17	12	17	58	62	−4	63	

Source: BBC Sport
Rules for classification: 1) Points; 2) Goal difference; 3) Number of goals scored

==== Result summary ====
Overall								Home						Away					
Pld	W	D	L	GF	GA	GD	Pts	W	D	L	GF	GA	GD	W	D	L	GF	GA	GD
46	20	6	20	57	56	+1	66	12	3	8	33	21	+12	8	3	12	24	35	−11

Last updated: 5 May 2018.
Source: BBC

==== Results by matchday ====
Matchday	1	2	3	4	5	6	7	8	9	10	11	12	13	14	15	16	17	18	19	20	21	22	23	24	25	26	27	28	29	30	31	32	33	34	35	36	37	38	39	40	41	42	43	44	45	46
Ground	H	A	H	A	H	A	A	H	A	H	H	A	H	A	A	H	A	H	A	H	A	H	A	H	H	A	A	H	A	H	H	A	H	A	H	A	H	A	H	A	H	A	A	H	A	H
Result	W	L	D	D	L	W	L	W	L	W	L	W	W	L	L	L	W	W	L	W	W	W	L	W	W	L	D	L	L	D	W	L	L	W	L	L	W	W	W	W	D	D	L	L	L	W
Position	3	12	13	14	16	14	13	12	15	11	15	13	8	11	12	14	11	10	11	7	7	7	8	8	6	6	6	7	9	9	9	8	9	10	10	11	12	10	10	10	9	8	8	8	9	8

Updated to match(es) played on 5 May 2018. Source: Statto.com
A = Away; H = Home; W = Win; D = Draw; L = Loss

==== Matches ====
On 21 June 2017, the league fixtures were announced.

5 August 2017 1	Portsmouth	2–0	Rochdale	Portsmouth
15:00 BST	Pitman 46', 90+2'; Lowe (red card) 81'	Report	Keane (red card) 21'	Stadium: Fratton Park; Attendance: 18,009; Referee: Lee Probert

12 August 2017 2	Oxford United	3–0	Portsmouth	Oxford
15:00 BST	Thomas 47' van Kessel 82'; Ruffels 90+4'	Report		Stadium: Kassam Stadium; Attendance: 9,510 (1,810 away); Referee: Graham Salisbury

19 August 2017 3	Portsmouth	1–1	Walsall	Portsmouth
15:00 BST	Pitman 74' (pen.) (yellow card) 87'	Report	Chambers (yellow card) 3'; Leahy 47'; Guthrie (yellow card) 55'; Devlin (yellow card) 63'; Bakayoko (yellow card) 67'	Stadium: Fratton Park; Attendance: 17,198; Referee: Brett Huxtable

26 August 2017 4	Wigan Athletic	1–1	Portsmouth	Wigan
15:00 BST	Toney 8'; Dunkley (red card) 59'	Report	Chaplin 76'; Evans (yellow card) 25' (red card) 89'	Stadium: DW Stadium; Attendance: 9,685; Referee: Robert Jones

3 September 2017 5	Portsmouth	0–1	Rotherham United	Portsmouth
14:30 BST	Burgess (yellow card) 80'	Report	Taylor 36'; Potter (yellow card) 60'; Purrington (yellow card) 71'; Vaulks (yellow card) 90+5'	Stadium: Fratton Park; Attendance: 17,118; Referee: Gavin Ward

9 September 2017 6	AFC Wimbledon	0–2	Portsmouth	Kingston upon Thames
15:00 BST		Report	O'Keefe (yellow card) 14'; Pitman 38' (pen.); Chaplin 50'; May (yellow card) 63'; Burgess (yellow card) 79'	Stadium: Kingsmeadow; Attendance: 4,585; Referee: Kevin Johnson

12 September 2017 7	Northampton Town	3–1	Portsmouth	Sixfields, Northampton
19:45 BST	Long 18', 70'; Crooks 35'	Report	Thompson (yellow card) 11'; O'Keefe (yellow card) 14'; Clarke (yellow card) 42'; Kennedy 49'; Lowe (yellow card) 62'	Stadium: Sixfields Stadium; Attendance: 5,855; Referee: Darren Drysdale

16 September 2017 8	Portsmouth	4–1	Fleetwood Town	Portsmouth
15:00 BST	Pitman 41', 78'; Lowe 57', 70'	Report	Bolger (yellow card) 34'; Cole 52'; Dempsey (yellow card) 66' (yellow-red card) 85'	Stadium: Fratton Park; Attendance: 17,192; Referee: Dean Whitestone

23 September 2017 9	Scunthorpe United	2–0	Portsmouth	Scunthorpe
15:00 BST	Novak 12'; Holmes 33'	Report		Stadium: Glanford Park; Attendance: 4,685; Referee: Anthony Backhouse

26 September 2017 10	Portsmouth	3–0	Bristol Rovers	Portsmouth
19:45 BST	O'Keefe (yellow card) 29'; Hawkins 42'; Pitman 77', 85'	Report	Harrison (yellow card) 39'; Lockyer (yellow card) 57'	Stadium: Fratton Park; Attendance: 17,716; Referee: John Busby

30 September 2017 11	Portsmouth	1–2	Oldham Athletic	Portsmouth
15:00 BST	Pitman 90'; O'Keefe (yellow card) 90+5'	Report	Doyle 16', 47'; Dummigan (yellow card) 33'; Bryan (yellow card) 51'; Byrne (yellow card) 66'; Banks (yellow card) 83'; Davies (yellow card) 90+4'; Placide (yellow card) 90+6'	Stadium: Fratton Park; Attendance: 17,848; Referee: Craig Hicks

8 October 2017 12	Gillingham	0–1	Portsmouth	Gillingham
14:30 BST	Ehmer (yellow card) 85'	Report	Clarke (yellow card) 45+1'; Kennedy 46'; Thompson (yellow card) 74'	Stadium: Priestfield Stadium; Attendance: 8,163; Referee: Chris Sarginson

14 October 2017 13	Portsmouth	2–0	Milton Keynes Dons	Portsmouth
15:00 BST	Hawkins 14', 45+2'; Kennedy (yellow card) 51'	Report	Williams (yellow card) 45'; Ebanks-Landell (yellow card) 90'; Nicholls (yellow card) 90'	Stadium: Fratton Park; Attendance: 17,608; Referee: Graham Horwood

17 October 2017 14	Doncaster Rovers	2–1	Portsmouth	Doncaster
19:45 BST	Mandeville 3'; Burgess 5' (o.g.); Rowe (yellow card) 78'	Report	Baudry 54' (o.g.); Burgess (yellow card) 58'; Donohue (red card) 71'; O'Keefe (yellow card) 87'	Stadium: Keepmoat Stadium; Attendance: 7,211; Referee: Martin Coy

21 October 2017 15	Blackburn Rovers	3–0	Portsmouth	Blackburn
15:00 BST	Dack 38'; Graham 58'; Nyambe (yellow card) 60'; Samuel (red card) 87'; Conway 90'	Report	Donohue (yellow card) 54'	Stadium: Ewood Park; Attendance: Chris Kavanagh; Referee: 11,673

28 October 2017 16	Portsmouth	0–1	Bradford City	Portsmouth
15:00 BST	Donohue (yellow card) 79'; Pitman (yellow card) 86'	Report	McMahon (yellow card) 75'; Kilgallon 80'	Stadium: Fratton Park; Attendance: 18,067; Referee: Dean Whitestone

11 November 2017 17	Blackpool	2–3	Portsmouth	Blackpool
15:00 GMT	Solomon-Otabor 74'; Hawkins 83' (o.g.)	Report	Pitman 52', 86'; Close 80'; Clarke (yellow card) 82'	Stadium: Bloomfield Road; Attendance: 5,032; Referee: Jonathan Moss

18 November 2017 18	Portsmouth	1–0	Southend United	Portsmouth
15:00 GMT	Pitman 54'	Report	White (yellow card) 76'	Stadium: Fratton Park; Attendance: 18,431; Referee: Carl Boyeson

21 November 2017 19	Peterborough United	2–1	Portsmouth	Peterborough
19:45 GMT	Grant (yellow card) 54'; Marriott 58'; Clarke 70' (o.g.); Edwards (yellow card) 86'	Report	Burgess (yellow card) 69'; Chaplin 78'	Stadium: London Road Stadium; Attendance: 5,217; Referee: Craig Hicks

25 November 2017 20	Portsmouth	1–0	Plymouth Argyle	Portsmouth
15:00 GMT	Naismith 25'; Kennedy (yellow card) 90+3'	Report	Sawyer (yellow card) 32'; Diagouraga (yellow card) 90+9'	Stadium: Fratton Park; Attendance: 17,923; Referee: Bobby Madley

9 December 2017 21	Charlton Athletic	0–1	Portsmouth	Charlton
15:00 GMT	Holmes (yellow card) 71'	Report	Magennis 47' (o.g.); Evans (yellow card) 70'; Thompson (yellow card) 73'	Stadium: The Valley; Attendance: 16,361; Referee: Andrew Madley

16 December 2017 22	Portsmouth	1–0	Bury	Portsmouth
15:00 GMT	Bennett (yellow card) 17'; Clarke 62'; Evans (yellow card) 78'	Report	O'Connell (yellow card) 27'	Stadium: Fratton Park; Attendance: 17,549; Referee: (England) John Brooks

23 December 2017 23	Shrewsbury Town	2–0	Portsmouth	Shrewsbury
15:00 GMT	Morris (yellow card) 57'; Whalley 59'; Payne 81'; Nolan (yellow card) 89'	Report	Clarke (yellow card) 17'; Lowe (yellow card) 29'; Haunstrup (yellow card) 43'	Stadium: Montgomery Waters Meadow; Attendance: 7,429; Referee: (England) Darren Handley

26 December 2017 24	Portsmouth	2–1	AFC Wimbledon	Portsmouth
15:00 GMT	Close 45'; Pitman 72' (pen.)	Report	Soares (yellow card) 9'; Barcham (yellow card) 26'; Taylor 50' (pen.); Fuller (yellow card) 71'; Trotter (yellow card) 89'	Stadium: Fratton Park; Attendance: 18,644; Referee: (England) Lee Collins

30 December 2017 25	Portsmouth	3–1	Northampton Town	Portsmouth
15:00 GMT	Kennedy 41' (yellow card) 90+2'; Pitman (yellow card) 42'; Hawkins 45', 48'	Report	Long 36'; McGugan (yellow card) 45+2'; O'Toole (yellow card) 57'	Stadium: Fratton Park; Attendance: 18,539; Referee: (England) Lee Swabey

1 January 2018 26	Bristol Rovers	2–1	Portsmouth	Horfield
15:00 GMT	Partington (yellow card) 81'; Sinclair 84'; Sercombe 90'	Report	Hawkins 64'	Stadium: Memorial Stadium; Attendance: 10,014; Referee: (England) David Webb

13 January 2018 27	Portsmouth	1–1	Scunthorpe United	Portsmouth
15:00 GMT	Lowe 15'; Clarke (yellow card) 78'; Hawkins (yellow card) 89'	Report	van Veen 53'; Bishop (yellow card) 76'; Adelakun (yellow card) 82'	Stadium: Fratton Park; Attendance: 17,741; Referee: (England) Charles Breakspear

20 January 2018 28	Rotherham United	1–0	Portsmouth	Rotherham
15:00 GMT	Emmanuel (yellow card) 31'; Mattock 90+1'	Report		Stadium: New York Stadium; Attendance: 9,129; Referee: Robert Jones

27 January 2018 29	Portsmouth	0–1	Shrewsbury Town	Portsmouth
15:00 GMT	May (yellow card) 16' (yellow-red card); Evans (yellow card) 37'	Report	Bolton 21'; C. Morris (yellow card) 38'; Rodman (yellow card) 60'; Payne (yellow card) 90'	Stadium: Fratton Park; Attendance: 17,779; Referee: David Coote

3 February 2018 30	Portsmouth	2–2	Doncaster Rovers	Portsmouth
15:00 GMT	Walkes 19'; Burgess (yellow card) 45+3'; Donohue (yellow card) 45+3'; Pitman 81'; Burgess (yellow card) 90+3' (red card)	Report	Coppinger 4'; Marquis (yellow card) 45+3'; Marquis 63'; Anderson (yellow card) 90+1'	Stadium: Fratton Park; Attendance: 17,364; Referee: Graham Salisbury

10 February 2018 31	Milton Keynes Dons	1–2	Portsmouth	Milton Keynes
15:00 GMT	Ugbo 21'; Tymon (yellow card) 70'	Report	Clarke 84', (yellow card) 86'; Thompson (yellow card) 90'; Chaplin 90+3'	Stadium: Stadium MK; Attendance: 14,762 (6,257 Portsmouth fans); Referee: John Brooks

13 February 2018 32	Portsmouth	1–2	Blackburn Rovers	Portsmouth
19:45 GMT	Thompson (yellow card) 30'; Chaplin 50'	Report	Dack (yellow card) 3'; Armstrong 21', 87'; Travis (red card) 90+2'	Stadium: Fratton Park; Attendance: 18,152; Referee: Oliver Langford

17 February 2018 33	Southend United	3–1	Portsmouth	Southend-on-Sea
15:00 GMT	Clarke 6' (o.g.); Demetriou 12', 84'	Report	Evans 36'; Thompson (red card) 64'	Stadium: Roots Hall; Attendance: 9,397; Referee: Lee Probert

20 February 2018 34	Fleetwood Town	1–2	Portsmouth	Fleetwood
19:45 GMT	McAleny 81', (yellow card) 90+2'; Hunter (yellow card) 80'	Report	Lowe 24'; Hawkins 75'	Stadium: Highbury Stadium; Attendance: 2,561; Referee: David Webb

24 February 2018 35	Portsmouth	0–2	Blackpool	Portsmouth
15:00 GMT	Lowe (yellow card) 17'	Report	Vassell 41'; Ryan (yellow card) 56'; Robertson 63'	Stadium: Fratton Park; Attendance: 17,895; Referee: Gavin Ward

10 March 2018 36	Portsmouth	1–3	Gillingham	Portsmouth
15:00 GMT	Lowe 19'; Burgess (yellow card) 28'	Report	Wilkinson 48'; Martin 66', 80'	Stadium: Fratton Park; Attendance: 18,247; Referee: Carl Boyeson

17 March 2018 37	Oldham Athletic	0–2	Portsmouth	Oldham
15:00 GMT		Report	Pitman 29', 42' (yellow card) 90+5'; Clarke (yellow card) 47'; Donohue (yellow card) 90+9'	Stadium: Boundary Park; Attendance: 4,306; Referee: Seb Stockbridge

25 March 2018 38	Portsmouth	3–0	Oxford United	Portsmouth
15:00 BST	Naismith 5' (yellow card) 46'; Thompson (yellow card) 45'; McGee (yellow card) 63'; Pitman 69', 79'	Report	Ledson (yellow card) 14'; Dickie (yellow card) 27'; Mowatt (red card) 62'; Brannagan (yellow card) 75'	Stadium: Fratton Park; Attendance: 17,892 (1,050 away); Referee: Charles Breakspear

31 March 2018 39	Walsall	0–1	Portsmouth	Bescot
15:00 BST	Devlin (yellow card) 36'; Bakayoko (yellow card) 58'; Guthrie (yellow card) 76'; Morris (yellow card) 87'	Report	Donohue (yellow card) 43'; Evans 79'; Walkes (yellow card) 86'	Stadium: Bescot Stadium; Attendance: 5,159; Referee: Darren Handley

2 April 2018 40	Portsmouth	2–1	Wigan Athletic	Portsmouth
17:30 BST	Thompson (yellow card) 25'; Pitman 40' (pen.); Lowe 55'; Walkes (yellow card) 71'; Naismith (yellow card) 81'	Report	Elder (yellow card) 19'; Grigg 89'; Walton (yellow card) 90+4'	Stadium: Fratton Park; Attendance: 17,842; Referee: Tim Robinson

7 April 2018 41	Rochdale	3–3	Portsmouth	Rochdale
15:00 BST	Inman 13'; Humphrys 57'; Henderson 71'	Report	Pitman 26', 62'; Done 90+2' (o.g.)	Stadium: Spotland Stadium; Attendance: 3,781; Referee: Andy Haines

14 April 2018 42	Plymouth Argyle	0–0	Portsmouth	Plymouth
15:00 GMT		Report		Stadium: Home Park; Attendance: 14,634 (1,600 away); Referee: Dean Whitestone

17 April 2018 43	Bradford City	3–1	Portsmouth	Bradford
	Knight-Percival 14'; Lund 71'; Wyke 90+5'	Report	Pitman 61', (yellow card) 90'; O'Keefe (yellow card) 90'	Stadium: Valley Parade; Attendance: 19,554; Referee: Andy Woolmer

21 April 2018 44	Portsmouth	0–1	Charlton Athletic	Portsmouth
15:00 BST	Pitman (yellow card) 82'; Evans (yellow card) 90+1'	Report	Ajose 40'; Kashi (yellow card) 79'; Dasilva (yellow card) 81'	Stadium: Fratton Park; Attendance: 19,210; Referee: Mark Heywood

28 April 2018 45	Bury	1–0	Portsmouth	Bury
15:00 BST	Miller (yellow card) 53' (goal) 67'	Report	Thompson (yellow card) 40'; Donohue (yellow card) 48'	Stadium: Gigg Lane; Attendance: 4,575; Referee: Andy Haines

5 May 2018 46	Portsmouth	2–0	Peterborough United	Portsmouth
17:30 BST	Pitman 13', 25'; Thompson (yellow card) 55'	Report		Stadium: Fratton Park; Attendance: 18,118; Referee: John Busby

=== FA Cup ===
On 16 October 2017, Portsmouth were drawn away to Luton Town in the first round.

4 November 2017 First round	Luton Town	1–0	Portsmouth	Luton
15:00 GMT	Collins (yellow card) 9' (goal) 45+1'; Lee (yellow card) 24'	Report	Thompson (yellow card) 9' (yellow-red card) 84'; Lowe (yellow card) 50'; Burgess (yellow card) 53'; O'Keefe (yellow card) 72'	Stadium: Kenilworth Road; Attendance: 5,333; Referee: Sebastian Stockbridge

=== EFL Cup ===
On 16 June 2017, Portsmouth were drawn away to Cardiff City in the first round.

8 August 2017 First round	Cardiff City	2–1 (a.e.t.)	Portsmouth	Leckwith
19:45 BST	Murphy (yellow card) 45'; Mendez-Laing 48'; Halford 113'	Report	32' (o.g.) Morrison	Stadium: Cardiff City Stadium; Attendance: 6,592; Referee: Steve Martin

=== EFL Trophy ===
On 12 July 2017, Portsmouth were drawn in Southern Group A against Charlton Athletic, Crawley Town and Fulham U23s. After winning the group stages, Portsmouth were drawn at home to Northampton Town in the second round. A third round trip to Stamford Bridge to face Chelsea U21s was next for Pompey.

Pos	Lge	Team	Pld	W	PW	PL	L	GF	GA	GD	Pts	Qualification
1	L1	Portsmouth (Q)	3	2	0	1	0	7	4	+3	7	Round 2
2	L1	Charlton Athletic (Q)	3	2	0	0	1	5	3	+2	6	Round 2
3	ACA	Fulham U21 (E)	3	1	1	0	1	8	7	+1	5	
4	L2	Crawley Town (E)	3	0	0	0	3	2	8	−6	0	

Updated to match(es) played on 7 November 2017. Source: EFL.com
(E) Eliminated; (Q) Qualified to the phase indicated

16 August 2017 Group Game 1	Portsmouth	3–3 (2–4 p)	Fulham U23s	Portsmouth
19:45 BST	Lowe 54', 66'; Naismith 57'	Report	Humphrys 21'; Williams 62' (pen.); Adebayo 82'	Stadium: Fratton Park; Attendance: 1,520; Referee: Carl Brook
	Penalties
	Chaplin (penalty scored); Naismith (penalty missed); Bennett (penalty scored); Evans (penalty missed)		Williams (penalty scored); Humphrys (penalty scored); Þorsteinsson (penalty scored); Kavanagh (penalty scored)

3 October 2017 Group Game 2	Portsmouth	3–1	Crawley Town	Portsmouth
19:45 BST	May (yellow card) 27'; Clarke 30'; Hawkins 35'; O'Keefe 71'	Report	Djaló (yellow card) 53'; Sanoh 65'	Stadium: Fratton Park; Attendance: 1,527; Referee: Tim Robinson

7 November 2017 Group Game 3	Charlton Athletic	0–1	Portsmouth	Charlton
19:45 GMT		Report	Main 19'	Stadium: The Valley; Attendance: 1,307; Referee: Nick Kinseley

2 December 2017 Second round	Portsmouth	2–0	Northampton Town	Portsmouth
12:30 GMT	Evans 41'; O'Keefe 58'	Report		Stadium: Fratton Park; Attendance: 1,780; Referee: Tom Nield

9 January 2018 Third round	Portsmouth	1–2	Chelsea U21s	Portsmouth
19:45 GMT	Pitman 90+3'; Burgess (yellow card) 90+4'	Report	Musonda 58', 90+6'	Stadium: Fratton Park; Attendance: 3,116; Referee: Gavin Ward

== Statistics ==
=== Appearances and goals ===
As of match(es) played 5 May 2018

Players with no appearances are not included on the list
Italics indicate a loaned in player

No.	Pos	Nat	Player	Total		League One		FA Cup		EFL Cup		EFL Trophy	
No.	Pos	Nat	Player	Apps	Goals	Apps	Goals	Apps	Goals	Apps	Goals	Apps	Goals
1	GK	(England) ENG	Luke McGee	50	0	44+0	0	1+0	0	1+0	0	4+0	0
2	DF	(England) ENG	Anton Walkes	12	1	12+0	1	0+0	0	0+0	0	0+0	0
3	DF	(England) ENG	Tareiq Holmes-Dennis	1	0	1+0	0	0+0	0	0+0	0	0+0	0
4	MF	(England) ENG	Danny Rose	19	0	13+2	0	0+0	0	1+0	0	3+0	0
5	DF	(England) ENG	Matt Clarke	46	3	42+0	2	1+0	0	0+0	0	3+0	1
6	DF	(England) ENG	Christian Burgess	39	0	34+1	0	1+0	0	1+0	0	2+0	0
7	MF	(England) ENG	Stuart O'Keefe	25	2	17+4	0	1+0	0	0+0	0	2+1	2
8	FW	(Jersey) JER	Brett Pitman	41	25	35+3	24	1+0	0	1+0	0	0+1	1
9	FW	(England) ENG	Oliver Hawkins	35	8	22+9	7	1+0	0	0+0	0	3+0	1
11	FW	(Northern Ireland) NIR	Matty Kennedy	33	3	20+9	3	1+0	0	0+0	0	1+2	0
13	GK	(Republic of Ireland) IRL	Stephen Henderson	1	0	1+0	0	0+0	0	0+0	0	0+0	0
14	MF	(Republic of Ireland) IRL	Connor Ronan	17	0	8+8	0	0+0	0	0+0	0	1+0	0
15	FW	(England) ENG	Nicke Kabamba	2	0	0+1	0	0+0	0	0+1	0	0+0	0
16	DF	(England) ENG	Jack Whatmough	16	0	14+0	0	0+0	0	1+0	0	1+0	0
17	MF	(Wales) WAL	Dion Donohue	35	0	29+3	0	0+0	0	0+0	0	3+0	0
18	FW	(Jamaica) JAM	Jamal Lowe	50	8	39+5	7	1+0	0	0+0	0	3+2	2
19	FW	(England) ENG	Conor Chaplin	32	5	11+15	5	0+1	0	0+1	0	1+3	0
20	DF	(England) ENG	Nathan Thompson	40	0	34+2	0	1+0	0	0+0	0	3+0	0
22	FW	(Scotland) SCO	Kal Naismith	31	3	19+7	2	0+0	0	1+0	0	3+1	1
26	MF	(England) ENG	Gareth Evans	37	3	26+6	2	0+0	0	1+0	0	4+0	1
29	DF	(France) FRA	Sylvain Deslandes	2	0	2+0	0	0+0	0	0+0	0	0+0	0
30	MF	(England) ENG	Adam May	18	0	10+3	0	0+0	0	1+0	0	4+0	0
33	MF	(England) ENG	Ben Close	45	2	37+3	2	1+0	0	0+1	0	2+1	0
35	GK	(England) ENG	Alex Bass	2	0	1+0	0	0+0	0	0+0	0	1+0	0
38	DF	(England) ENG	Brandon Haunstrup	20	0	13+3	0	1+0	0	1+0	0	1+1	0
39	DF	(England) ENG	Joe Hancott	1	0	0+0	0	0+0	0	0+0	0	1+0	0
Player(s) who featured whilst on loan but returned to parent club during the season:
2	DF	(Republic of Ireland) IRL	Damien McCrory	3	0	3+0	0	0+0	0	0+0	0	0+0	0
Player(s) who featured but departed permanently during the season:
2	DF	(England) ENG	Tom Davies	1	0	0+0	0	0+0	0	0+0	0	1+0	0
10	FW	(Slovakia) SVK	Milan Lalkovič	2	0	1+0	0	0+0	0	0+0	0	1+0	0
14	FW	(England) ENG	Curtis Main	9	1	2+3	0	0+0	0	0+0	0	4+0	1
23	FW	(England) ENG	Kyle Bennett	22	0	11+7	0	0+1	0	1+0	0	1+1	0
25	DF	(England) ENG	Drew Talbot	7	0	4+0	0	0+0	0	1+0	0	0+2	0

=== Disciplinary record ===
As of match(es) played 5 May 2018

Players with no cards are not included on the list
Italics indicate a loaned in player

No.	Pos	Nat	Player	Total		League One		FA Cup		EFL Cup		EFL Trophy	
No.	Pos	Nat	Player	Yellow card	Red card	Yellow card	Red card	Yellow card	Red card	Yellow card	Red card	Yellow card	Red card
1	GK	(England) ENG	Luke McGee	1	0	1	0	0	0	0	0	0	0
2	DF	(England) ENG	Anton Walkes	2	0	2	0	0	0	0	0	0	0
5	DF	(England) ENG	Matt Clarke	7	0	7	0	0	0	0	0	0	0
6	DF	(England) ENG	Christian Burgess	9	1	7	1	1	0	0	0	1	0
7	MF	(England) ENG	Stuart O'Keefe	6	0	5	0	1	0	0	0	0	0
8	FW	(Jersey) JER	Brett Pitman	7	0	7	0	0	0	0	0	0	0
9	FW	(England) ENG	Oliver Hawkins	1	0	1	0	0	0	0	0	0	0
11	FW	(Northern Ireland) NIR	Matty Kennedy	4	0	4	0	0	0	0	0	0	0
16	DF	(England) ENG	Jack Whatmough	1	0	1	0	0	0	0	0	0	0
17	MF	(Wales) WAL	Dion Donohue	7	1	7	1	0	0	0	0	0	0
18	FW	(Jamaica) JAM	Jamal Lowe	5	1	4	1	1	0	0	0	0	0
20	DF	(England) ENG	Nathan Thompson	10	2	8	1	2	1	0	0	0	0
22	FW	(Scotland) SCO	Kal Naismith	2	0	2	0	0	0	0	0	0	0
26	MF	(England) ENG	Gareth Evans	6	1	6	1	0	0	0	0	0	0
30	MF	(England) ENG	Adam May	3	1	2	1	0	0	0	0	1	0
38	DF	(England) ENG	Brandon Haunstrup	1	0	1	0	0	0	0	0	0	0
Player(s) who featured but departed permanently during the season:
23	FW	(England) ENG	Kyle Bennett	1	0	1	0	0	0	0	0	0	0
Squad Total				72	7	65	6	5	1	0	0	2	0
