= 2015–16 Portsmouth F.C. season =

Portsmouth
2015–16 season
- Owner: Pompey Supporters Trust
- Chairman: Iain McInnes
- Manager: Paul Cook
- Stadium: Fratton Park
- League Two: 6th
- FA Cup: Fourth round (eliminated by Bournemouth)
- League Cup: Second round (eliminated by Reading)
- FL Trophy: First round (eliminated by Exeter City)
- Top goalscorer: League: Marc McNulty; Gareth Evans (10 each); All: Marc McNulty (12)
- Highest home attendance: 18,746 vs. Northampton Town (7 May 2016)
- Lowest home attendance: 13,616 vs. York City (24 November 2015)
- Average home league attendance: 16,181
Home colours	Away colours	Third colours

The 2015–16 season was Portsmouth's third consecutive season in League Two. Along with competing in League Two, the club participated in the FA Cup, League Cup and Football League Trophy. The season covers the period from 1 July 2015 to 30 June 2016.

== Players ==
=== Squad ===
As of 19 May 2016

Note: Flags indicate national team as defined under FIFA eligibility rules; some limited exceptions apply. Players may hold more than one non-FIFA nationality.

No.	Pos.	Nation	Player
1	GK	ENG	Paul Jones
2	GK	ENG	Ben Davies
3	DF	IRL	Enda Stevens
4	DF	ENG	Adam Webster
6	DF	ENG	Christian Burgess
7	FW	NIR	Adam McGurk
8	MF	IRL	Michael Doyle (captain)
10	FW	SCO	Marc McNulty (on loan from Sheffield United)
11	MF	ENG	Gary Roberts
14	FW	SCO	Kal Naismith
15	MF	IRL	Adam Barton
16	DF	ENG	Jack Whatmough
17	DF	WAL	Kieron Freeman
18	MF	ENG	Ben Tollitt
19	FW	ENG	Conor Chaplin

No.	Pos.	Nation	Player
20	DF	ENG	Matt Clarke (on loan from Ipswich Town)
23	FW	ENG	Kyle Bennett
24	GK	IRL	Brian Murphy
25	FW	IRL	Conor Wilkinson (on loan from Bolton)
26	MF	ENG	Gareth Evans
27	GK	SCO	Ryan Fulton (on loan from Liverpool)
29	MF	ENG	Danny Hollands
30	MF	ENG	Adam May
31	FW	ENG	Brandon Joseph-Buadi
32	MF	ENG	Christian Oxlade-Chamberlain
33	MF	ENG	Ben Close
35	GK	ENG	Alex Bass
36	DF	ENG	Dory Yates
38	DF	ENG	Brandon Haunstrup
40	FW	ENG	Kaleem Haitham

== Transfers ==
=== In ===
No.	Pos.	Nat.	Name	Age	EU	Moving from	Type	Transfer window	Ends	Transfer fee	Source
—		(England)	Paul Cook	48	EU	Chesterfield	Job Offer	Summer	2016	compensation	Portsmouth FC
23	MF	(England)	Kyle Bennett	24	EU	Doncaster Rovers	Transfer	Summer	2017	Free	Portsmouth FC
14	MF	(Scotland)	Kal Naismith	23	EU	Accrington Stanley	Transfer	Summer	2018	Undisclosed	Portsmouth FC
3	DF	(Republic of Ireland)	Enda Stevens	24	EU	Aston Villa	Transfer	Summer	2017	Free	Portsmouth FC
11	MF	(England)	Gary Roberts	31	EU	Chesterfield	Transfer	Summer	2018	Undisclosed	Portsmouth FC
7	FW	(Northern Ireland)	Adam McGurk	26	EU	Burton Albion	Transfer	Summer	2017	Free	Portsmouth FC
15	MF	(Republic of Ireland)	Adam Barton	24	EU	Coventry City	Transfer	Summer	2017	Free	Portsmouth FC
—	DF	(England)	Chad Field	18	EU	Youth system	Promoted	Summer	2016	Free	Portsmouth FC
38	DF	(England)	Brandon Haunstrup	18	EU	Youth system	Promoted	Summer	2016	Free	Portsmouth FC
—	DF	(Norway)	Snorre Nilsen	18	EU	Youth system	Promoted	Summer	2016	Free	Portsmouth FC
6	DF	(England)	Christian Burgess	23	EU	Peterborough United	Transfer	Summer	2018	£75,000	Portsmouth FC
8	MF	(Republic of Ireland)	Michael Doyle	33	EU	Sheffield United	Transfer	Summer	2016	Free	Portsmouth FC
17	FW	(England)	Jayden Stockley	21	EU	Bournemouth	Loan	Summer	2016	Free	Portsmouth FC
18	MF	(England)	Ben Tollitt	20	EU	Skelmersdale United	Transfer	Summer	2016	Free	Portsmouth FC
26	MF	(England)	Gareth Evans	27	EU	Fleetwood Town	Transfer	Summer	2016	Free	Portsmouth FC
30	MF	(England)	Adam May	17	EU	Youth system	Promoted	Summer	2016	Free	Portsmouth FC
20	DF	(England)	Matt Clarke	18	EU	Ipswich Town	Loan	Summer	2016	Free	Portsmouth FC
2	MF	(England)	Ben Davies	34	EU	Sheffield United	Transfer	Summer	2016	Free	Portsmouth FC
24	GK	(Republic of Ireland)	Brian Murphy	32	EU	Queens Park Rangers	Transfer	Summer	2016	Free	Portsmouth FC
5	MF	(Benin)	Romuald Boco	30	EU	Bharat FC (India)	Transfer	During season	2016	Free	Portsmouth FC
27	GK	(Republic of Ireland)	Aaron McCarey	23	EU	Wolverhampton Wanderers	Loan	During season	2015	Free	Portsmouth FC
13	FW	(Northern Ireland)	Caolan Lavery	22	EU	Sheffield Wednesday	Loan	During season	2015	Free	Portsmouth FC
10	FW	(Scotland)	Marc McNulty	23	EU	Sheffield United	Loan	During season	2016	Free	Portsmouth FC
27	GK	(Scotland)	Ryan Fulton	19	EU	Liverpool	Loan	Winter	2016	Free	Portsmouth FC
17	DF	(Wales)	Kieron Freeman	23	EU	Sheffield United	Loan	Winter	2016	Free	Portsmouth FC
21	FW	(England)	Michael Smith	24	EU	Swindon Town	Loan	Winter	2016	Free	Portsmouth FC
25	FW	(Republic of Ireland)	Conor Wilkinson	21	EU	Bolton Wanderers	Loan	During season	2016	Free	Portsmouth FC
22	GK	(England)	Ryan Allsop	23	EU	Bournemouth	Loan	During season	2016	Free	Portsmouth FC

Total spending: ▼£225,000

=== Out ===
No.	Pos.	Nat.	Name	Age	EU	Moving to	Type	Transfer window	Transfer fee	Source
15	FW	(England)	Paul McCallum	21	EU	West Ham United	Loan Return	Summer	Free	
18	DF	(England)	Josh Passley	20	EU	Fulham	Loan Return	Summer	Free	
24	DF	(Jamaica)	Nyron Nosworthy	34	EU	Blackpool	Loan Return	Summer	Free	
4	DF	(England)	Danny East	23	EU	Grimsby Town	Released	Summer	Free	Portsmouth FC; BBC Sport
5	DF	(England)	Joe Devera	28	EU	Boreham Wood	Released	Summer	Free	Portsmouth FC; BBC Sport
6	DF	(England)	Ben Chorley	32	EU	Bromley	Released	Summer	Free	Portsmouth FC; BBC Sport
11	FW	(England)	Tom Craddock	28	EU	Guiseley	Released	Summer	Free	Portsmouth FC; BBC Sport
17	DF	(England)	Nicky Shorey	33	EU	Pune City (India)	Released	Summer	Free	Portsmouth FC
19	MF	(England)	Wes Fogden	27	EU	Yeovil Town	Released	Summer	Free	Portsmouth FC; BBC Sport
26	MF	(England)	Bradley Tarbuck	19	EU	Dorchester Town	Released	Summer	Free	Portsmouth FC
34	DF	(England)	Dan Butler	20	EU	Torquay United	Released	Summer	Free	Portsmouth FC; BBC Sport
9	FW	(England)	Ryan Taylor	27	EU	Oxford United	Released	Summer	Free	Portsmouth FC; Oxford United FC
8	MF	(England)	Jed Wallace	21	EU	Wolverhampton Wanderers	Transfer	Summer	£275,000	Portsmouth FC
20	FW	(England)	Craig Westcarr	30	EU	Mansfield Town	Released	Summer	Free	Portsmouth FC
7	MF	(England)	Andy Barcham	28	EU	AFC Wimbledon	Released	Summer	Free	Portsmouth FC; AFC Wimbledon
13	MF	(Austria)	Johannes Ertl	32	EU	Free agent	Released	Summer	Free	Portsmouth FC
22	GK	(England)	Michael Poke	29	EU	Eastleigh	Loan	Summer	Free	Portsmouth FC
5	DF	(England)	Paul Robinson	33	EU	AFC Wimbledon	Mutual consent	Summer	Free	Portsmouth FC; AFC Wimbledon
—	DF	(England)	Chad Field	18	EU	Bognor Regis Town	Loan	Summer	Free	Portsmouth FC
—	DF	(Norway)	Snorre Nilsen	18	EU	Bognor Regis Town	Loan	Summer	Free	Portsmouth FC
—	MF	(Benin)	Romuald Boco	30	EU	Havant & Waterlooville	Loan	During season	Free	Portsmouth FC
34	DF	(England)	Calvin Davies	18	EU	Havant & Waterlooville	Loan	During season	Free	Portsmouth FC
27	GK	(Republic of Ireland)	Aaron McCarey	23	EU	Wolverhampton Wanderers	Loan return	During season	Free	Portsmouth FC
—	FW	(England)	Liam Sayers	17	EU	Dorchester Town	Loan	During season	Free	Dorchester Town FC
21	MF	(England)	James Dunne	26	EU	Dagenham & Redbridge	Loan	During season	Free	Portsmouth FC
30	MF	(England)	Adam May	17	EU	Gosport Borough	Loan	During season	Free	Portsmouth FC
14	MF	(Scotland)	Kal Naismith	23	EU	Hartlepool United	Loan	During season	Free	Portsmouth FC
1	GK	(England)	Paul Jones	29	EU	Crawley Town	Loan	Winter	Free	Portsmouth FC
9	FW	(England)	Matt Tubbs	31	EU	Eastleigh	Loan	During season	Free	Portsmouth FC

Total spending: ▲£275,000

=== Contracts ===
No.	Pos.	Nat.	Name	Age	Status	Contract length	Expiry date	Source
33	MF	(England)	Ben Close	18	Signed	1 year	June 2016	Portsmouth FC
2	DF	(England)	Adam Webster	19	Signed	2 years	June 2017	Portsmouth FC
8	FW	(England)	Ryan Taylor	27	Collapsed	0 year	June 2015	Portsmouth FC
30	MF	(England)	Adam May	17	Signed	1 year	June 2016	Portsmouth FC
19	FW	(England)	Conor Chaplin	18	Signed	3 years	June 2018	Portsmouth FC

== Player statistics ==
=== Squad stats ===
As of 19 May 2016

No.	Pos	Nat	Player	Total		League Two		FA Cup		League Cup		League Trophy		Play-offs	
No.	Pos	Nat	Player	Apps	Goals	Apps	Goals	Apps	Goals	Apps	Goals	Apps	Goals	Apps	Goals
1	GK	(England)	Paul Jones	10	0	7	0	0	0	2	0	1	0	0	0
2	DF	(England)	Ben Davies	51	1	43	1	5	0	1	0	0	0	2	0
3	DF	(Republic of Ireland)	Enda Stevens	53	0	45	0	5	0	0+1	0	0	0	2	0
4	DF	(England)	Adam Webster	35	2	24+3	2	4+1	0	2	0	1	0	0	0
6	DF	(England)	Christian Burgess	43	2	37	2	3+1	0	0	0	0	0	2	0
7	FW	(Northern Ireland)	Adam McGurk	36	6	12+15	2	4	3	2	1	1	0	0+2	0
8	MF	(Republic of Ireland)	Michael Doyle	50	1	43+1	1	4	0	0	0	0	0	2	0
10	FW	(Scotland)	Marc McNulty	34	12	19+8	10	4+1	1	0	0	0	0	2	1
11	MF	(England)	Gary Roberts	38	10	27+6	7	3	2	0	0	0	0	2	1
14	MF	(Scotland)	Kal Naismith	18	3	8+7	3	0+1	0	0	0	0+1	0	0+1	0
15	MF	(Republic of Ireland)	Adam Barton	21	0	11+5	0	2	0	0	0	1	0	2	0
16	DF	(England)	Jack Whatmough	2	0	1+1	0	0	0	0	0	0	0	0	0
17	DF	(Wales)	Kieron Freeman	7	0	4+3	0	0	0	0	0	0	0	0	0
18	MF	(England)	Ben Tollitt	15	1	0+12	1	0	0	0+2	0	1	0	0	0
19	FW	(England)	Conor Chaplin	38	11	6+24	8	1+3	1	1+1	2	1	0	0+1	0
20	DF	(England)	Matt Clarke	33	1	26+3	1	2	0	2	0	0	0	0	0
23	MF	(England)	Kyle Bennett	51	7	40+2	6	5	1	2	0	0	0	2	0
24	GK	(Republic of Ireland)	Brian Murphy	25	0	20+1	0	4	0	0	0	0	0	0	0
26	MF	(England)	Gareth Evans	48	10	32+8	10	3+1	0	2	0	0	0	2	0
27	GK	(Scotland)	Ryan Fulton	13	0	12	0	1	0	0	0	0	0	0	0
29	MF	(England)	Danny Hollands	39	0	27+5	0	3	0	2	0	0	0	2	0
30	MF	(England)	Adam May	2	0	0+1	0	0	0	0	0	1	0	0	0
32	MF	(England)	Christian Oxlade-Chamberlain	1	0	0	0	0	0	0	0	0+1	0	0	0
33	MF	(England)	Ben Close	14	0	6+1	0	2+1	0	2	0	1	0	0+1	0
35	GK	(England)	Alex Bass	0	0	0	0	0	0	0	0	0	0	0	0
36	DF	(England)	Dory Yates	0	0	0	0	0	0	0	0	0	0	0	0
38	DF	(England)	Brandon Haunstrup	5	0	1	0	0+1	0	2	0	1	0	0	0
40	MF	(England)	Kaleem Haitham	1	0	0	0	0	0	0	0	0+1	0	0	0
Players on loan to other clubs:
9	FW	(England)	Matt Tubbs	17	5	8+8	5	0	0	0+1	0	0	0	0	0
31	FW	(England)	Brandon Joseph-Buadi	1	0	0	0	0	0	0	0	1	0	0	0
34	DF	(England)	Calvin Davies	1	0	0	0	0	0	0	0	1	0	0	0
—	DF	(England)	Chad Field	0	0	0	0	0	0	0	0	0	0	0	0
—	DF	(Norway)	Snorre Nilsen	0	0	0	0	0	0	0	0	0	0	0	0
Players who have left the club after the start of the season:
5	MF	(Benin)	Romuald Boco	5	0	2+2	0	0+1	0	0	0	0	0	0	0
13	FW	(Northern Ireland)	Caolan Lavery	13	4	11+2	4	0	0	0	0	0	0	0	0
17	FW	(England)	Jayden Stockley	12	2	4+5	2	0+1	0	2	0	0	0	0	0
21	MF	(England)	James Dunne	1	0	0	0	0	0	0+1	0	0	0	0	0
21	FW	(England)	Michael Smith	16	4	13+3	4	0	0	0	0	0	0	0	0
22	GK	(England)	Michael Poke	0	0	0	0	0	0	0	0	0	0	0	0
22	GK	(England)	Ryan Allsop	2	0	0	0	0	0	0	0	0	0	2	0
25	MF	(France)	Nigel Atangana	13	0	8+5	0	0	0	0	0	0	0	0	0
27	GK	(Republic of Ireland)	Aaron McCarey	4	0	4	0	0	0	0	0	0	0	0	0

=== Top scorers ===
Place	Position	Nation	Number	Name	League Two	FA Cup	League Cup	FL Trophy	Play-offs	Total
1	FW	(Scotland)	10	Marc McNulty	10	1	0	0	1	12
2	FW	(England)	19	Conor Chaplin	8	1	2	0	0	11
3	MF	(England)	26	Gareth Evans	10	0	0	0	0	10
3	MF	(England)	11	Gary Roberts	7	2	0	0	1	10
4	MF	(England)	23	Kyle Bennett	6	0	0	0	0	6
4	FW	(Northern Ireland)	7	Adam McGurk	2	3	1	0	0	6
5	FW	(England)	9	Matt Tubbs	5	0	0	0	0	5
6	FW	(Northern Ireland)	13	Caolan Lavery	4	0	0	0	0	4
6	FW	(England)	21	Michael Smith	4	0	0	0	0	4
7	MF	(Scotland)	14	Kal Naismith	3	0	0	0	0	3
8	DF	(England)	4	Adam Webster	2	0	0	0	0	2
8	DF	(England)	6	Christian Burgess	2	0	0	0	0	2
8	FW	(England)	17	Jayden Stockley	2	0	0	0	0	2
7	DF	(England)	2	Ben Davies	1	0	0	0	0	1
7	MF	(England)	18	Ben Tollitt	1	0	0	0	0	1
7	DF	(England)	20	Matt Clarke	1	0	0	0	0	1
				Own goals	2	0	0	0	0	2
				TOTALS	75	8	3	0	2	88

=== Disciplinary record ===
Number	Nation	Position	Name	League Two		FA Cup		League Cup		FL Trophy		Play-offs		Total	
Number	Nation	Position	Name	Yellow card	Red card	Yellow card	Red card	Yellow card	Red card	Yellow card	Red card	Yellow card	Red card	Yellow card	Red card
3	(Republic of Ireland)	DF	Enda Stevens	9	1	0	0	0	0	0	0	0	0	9	1
6	(England)	DF	Christian Burgess	8	1	1	0	0	0	0	0	0	0	9	1
2	(England)	DF	Ben Davies	8	0	1	0	0	0	0	0	0	0	9	0
10	(Scotland)	FW	Marc McNulty	4	0	1	0	0	0	0	0	0	0	5	0
8	(Republic of Ireland)	MF	Michael Doyle	4	1	0	0	0	0	0	0	0	0	4	1
19	(England)	FW	Conor Chaplin	4	0	0	0	0	0	0	0	0	0	4	0
23	(England)	MF	Kyle Bennett	3	0	1	0	0	0	0	0	0	0	4	0
29	(England)	MF	Danny Hollands	3	0	0	0	0	0	0	0	1	0	4	0
20	(England)	DF	Matt Clarke	2	0	1	0	0	0	0	0	0	0	3	0
11	(England)	MF	Gary Roberts	2	1	0	0	0	0	0	0	0	0	2	1
26	(England)	MF	Gareth Evans	2	1	0	0	0	0	0	0	0	0	2	1
4	(England)	DF	Adam Webster	1	1	1	0	0	0	0	0	0	0	2	1
7	(Northern Ireland)	FW	Adam McGurk	2	0	0	0	0	0	0	0	0	0	2	0
17	(England)	FW	Jayden Stockley	2	0	0	0	0	0	0	0	0	0	2	0
15	(Republic of Ireland)	MF	Adam Barton	0	0	1	0	0	0	0	0	1	0	2	0
17	(Wales)	DF	Kieron Freeman	1	1	0	0	0	0	0	0	0	0	1	1
13	(Northern Ireland)	FW	Caolan Lavery	1	0	0	0	0	0	0	0	0	0	1	0
24	(Republic of Ireland)	GK	Brian Murphy	1	0	0	0	0	0	0	0	0	0	1	0
15	(Republic of Ireland)	MF	Adam Barton	0	0	0	0	0	0	0	0	1	0	1	0
			TOTALS	56	7	7	0	0	0	0	0	3	0	66	7

== Competitions ==
=== Pre-season friendlies ===
On 6 May 2015, Portsmouth announced two pre-season friendlies, Away to Havant & Waterlooville on 11 July 2015 and Away to Bognor Regis Town on 17 July 2015. On 28 May 2015, the club announced they will also travel to play Gillingham. A day later, Portsmouth announced they will travel to face Woking. On 31 May 2015, Portsmouth added Gosport Borough to their pre-season programme. On 11 July 2015, Portsmouth announced a friendly against Coventry City.

11 July 2015 Friendly	Havant & Waterlooville	1–1	Portsmouth	Havant
15:00 BST	Clifton 21'	Report	48' Doyle	Stadium: West Leigh Park; Referee: Dean Treleaven

17 July 2015 Friendly	Bognor Regis Town	1–1	Portsmouth	Bognor Regis
19:30 BST	Rutherford 57'	Report	8' Tubbs	Stadium: Nyewood Lane; Referee: Ashley Slaughter

18 July 2015 Friendly	Gosport Borough	2–3	Portsmouth	Gosport
15:00 BST	Bennett 73'; White 75'	Report	13' 89' Chaplin; 66' Robinson	Stadium: Privett Park; Attendance: 2,020; Referee: Dan Crooke

21 July 2015 Friendly	Portsmouth	2–1	Coventry City	Havant
19:30 BST	Chaplin 4'; Evans 45'	Report	53' Thomas	Stadium: West Leigh Park; Referee: Constantine Hatzidakis

24 July 2015 Friendly	Woking	0–2	Portsmouth	Woking
19:30 BST		Report	28' Evans; 31' Clarke	Stadium: Kingfield Stadium; Attendance: 1,562; Referee: Charlie Breakspear

1 August 2015 Friendly	Gillingham	0–0	Portsmouth	Gillingham
15:00 BST		Report		Stadium: Priestfield Stadium; Referee: Fred Graham

4 August 2015 Friendly	Burnham	0–5	Portsmouth XI	Burnham
19:30 BST		Report	McGurk 25'; Stockley 72'; Joseph-Buadi 82'; May; Oxlade-Chamberlain	Stadium: The Gore; Referee: Kieran Bailey

=== League Two ===
==== League table ====
Pos	Team	Pld	W	D	L	GF	GA	GD	Pts	Promotion, qualification or relegation
4	Accrington Stanley	46	24	13	9	74	48	+26	85	Qualification for League Two play-offs (Note: Four teams play for one spot and promotion to Football League One.)
5	Plymouth Argyle	46	24	9	13	72	46	+26	81	Qualification for League Two play-offs
6	Portsmouth	46	21	15	10	75	44	+31	78	Qualification for League Two play-offs
7	AFC Wimbledon (O, P)	46	21	12	13	64	50	+14	75	Qualification for League Two play-offs
8	Leyton Orient	46	19	12	15	60	61	−1	69	

Updated to match(es) played on 7 May 2016. Source: BBC Sport
Rules for classification: 1) Points; 2) Goal difference; 3) Number of goals scored
(O) Play-off winners; (P) Promoted

==== Matches ====
On 17 June 2015, the fixtures for the forthcoming season were announced.

Win Draw Loss Postponed

8 August 2015 1	Portsmouth	3–0	Dagenham & Redbridge	Portsmouth
15:00 BST	Evans 51'; Bennett 63', 74'	Report		Stadium: Fratton Park; Attendance: 16,948; Referee: Carl Boyeson

15 August 2015 2	Plymouth Argyle	1–2	Portsmouth	Plymouth
15:00 BST	Wylde 89'	Report	45' (pen.) Tubbs; 86' (pen.) Roberts	Stadium: Home Park; Attendance: 11,476; Referee: Steve Martin

18 August 2015 3	Crawley Town	0–0	Portsmouth	Crawley
19:45 BST		Report		Stadium: Broadfield Stadium; Attendance: 4,003; Referee: Fred Graham

22 August 2015 4	Portsmouth	3–3	Morecambe	Portsmouth
15:00 BST	Roberts 42', 65'; Stevens (red card) 72'; Stockley 90+5'	Report	11' Barkhuizen; 25' Goodall; 38' Fleming	Stadium: Fratton Park; Attendance: 16,052; Referee: Roger East

18 August 2015 3	Luton Town	1–2	Portsmouth	Luton
19:45 BST	Mackail-Smith 15' (pen.)	Report	8' Evans; 90' Tubbs	Stadium: Kenilworth Road; Attendance: 9,083; Referee: Peter Bankes

5 September 2015 6	Portsmouth	0–0	Accrington Stanley	Portsmouth
15:00 BST		Report		Stadium: Fratton Park; Attendance: 15,745; Referee: Brendan Malone

12 September 2015 7	Portsmouth	3–1	Barnet	Portsmouth
15:00 BST	Chaplin 37', 90'; McGurk 54'	Report	Yiadom 25'; Stephens (red card) 66'	Stadium: Fratton Park; Attendance: 16,217; Referee: Darren England

19 September 2015 8	Oxford United	1–1	Portsmouth	Oxford
15:00 BST	Sercombe 33'	Report	McGurk 61'; Doyle (red card) 81'	Stadium: Kassam Stadium; Attendance: 9,093; Referee: Iain Williamson

26 September 2015 9	Bristol Rovers	1–2	Portsmouth	Horfield
15:00 BST	Easter 48'	Report	Evans 29'; Stockley 71'	Stadium: Memorial Stadium; Attendance: 8,555; Referee: Jeremy Simpson

29 September 2015 10	Portsmouth	1–2	Exeter City	Portsmouth
15:00 BST	Roberts 90'	Report	Wheeler 20'; Davies 56'	Stadium: Fratton Park; Attendance: 15,822; Referee: Nick Kinseley

3 October 2015 11	Portsmouth	0–0	Yeovil Town	Portsmouth
15:00 BST		Report		Stadium: Fratton Park; Attendance: 17,309; Referee: Darren Deadman

10 October 2015 12	Cambridge United	1–3	Portsmouth	Cambridge
15:00 BST	Simpson 5'; M. Roberts (red card) 45+3'	Report	Legge 67' (o.g.); Tubbs 69', 87'; Evans (red card) 90+5'	Stadium: Abbey Stadium; Attendance: 6,607; Referee: Seb Stockbridge

17 October 2015 13	Newport County	0–1	Portsmouth	Newport
15:00 BST		Report	Tubbs 45'	Stadium: Rodney Parade; Attendance: 3,298; Referee: James Adcock

20 October 2015 14	Portsmouth	1–1	Stevenage	Portsmouth
19:45 BST	Chaplin 77'	Report	Williams 90'	Stadium: Fratton Park; Attendance: 14,900; Referee: Andy Woolmer

24 October 2015 15	Portsmouth	0–0	Mansfield Town	Portsmouth
15:00 BST		Report		Stadium: Fratton Park; Attendance: 16,210; Referee: Kevin Wright

31 October 2015 16	Notts County	2–1	Portsmouth	Nottingham
15:00 GMT	Burke 22'; Sheehan 77'	Report	Lavery 19'	Stadium: Meadow Lane; Attendance: 6,917; Referee: Andy Haines

15 November 2015 17	Portsmouth	0–0	AFC Wimbledon	Portsmouth
15:00 GMT		Report		Stadium: Fratton Park; Attendance: 15,892; Referee: Stuart Attwell

21 November 2015 18	Carlisle United	2–2	Portsmouth	Carlisle
15:00 GMT	Grainger 44' (pen.), 90'	Report	Lavery 66'; McNulty 68'	Stadium: Brunton Park; Attendance: 5,503; Referee: Scott Duncan

24 November 2015 19	Portsmouth	6–0	York City	Portsmouth
19:45 GMT	Davies 50'; McNulty 52', 60', 71'; Tollitt 80'; Chaplin 84'	Report	Greening (red card) 45'	Stadium: Fratton Park; Attendance: 13,616; Referee: Iain Williamson

28 November 2015 20	Wycombe Wanderers	2–2	Portsmouth	High Wycombe
15:00 GMT	Harriman 28'; Thompson 30'	Report	Lavery 45'; Webster 56'	Stadium: Adams Park; Attendance: 5,816; Referee: Mark Haywood

12 December 2015 21	Portsmouth	4–0	Hartlepool United	Portsmouth
15:00 GMT	Lavery 32'; Jackson 37' (o.g.); Evans 61'; McNulty 90'	Report		Stadium: Fratton Park; Attendance: 15,610; Referee: Chris Sarginson

19 December 2015 22	Northampton Town	1–2	Portsmouth	Northampton
15:00 GMT	Cresswell 17'	Report	Evans 33'; Chaplin 85'	Stadium: Sixfields Stadium; Attendance: 5,859; Referee: Fred Graham

26 December 2015 23	Leyton Orient	3-2	Portsmouth	Leyton
15:00 GMT	Simpson 23' (pen.); Palmer 45', 52'; Baudry (red card) 51'	Report	Webster (red card) 22'; Evans 4', 66'	Stadium: Matchroom Stadium; Attendance: 5,848; Referee: Graham Horwood

28 December 2015 24	Portsmouth	0-0	Luton Town	Portsmouth
15:00 GMT		Report		Stadium: Fratton Park; Attendance: 17,668; Referee: Gavin Ward

2 January 2016 25	Portsmouth	3-0	Crawley Town	Portsmouth
15:00 GMT	Clarke 13'; McNulty 26'; Roberts 83'	Report	Walton (yellow card) 77'	Stadium: Fratton Park; Attendance: 16,606; Referee: Dean Whitestone

16 January 2016 26	Accrington Stanley	P–P	Portsmouth	Accrington
15:00 GMT		Report		Stadium: Crown Ground; Referee: Trevor Kettle
Note: Match postponed due to frozen pitch

23 January 2016 27	Portsmouth	0–1	Oxford United	Portsmouth
15:00 GMT		Report	Mullins (yellow card) 30'; Bowery 76'	Stadium: Fratton Park; Attendance: 17,840; Referee: Neil Swarbrick

2 February 2016 28	Morecambe	1–1	Portsmouth	Morecambe
19:45 GMT	Fleming (yellow card) 58'; Beeley (yellow card) 89'; Roche 90+4'	Report	(yellow card) 31' Clarke; 40' Evans	Stadium: Globe Arena; Attendance: 1,399; Referee: Richard Clark

6 February 2016 29	Portsmouth	0–1	Leyton Orient	Portsmouth
15:00 GMT	Stevens (yellow card) 40'	Report	53' McAnuff; (yellow card) 79' Cisak	Stadium: Fratton Park; Attendance: 15,643; Referee: Graham Salisbury

13 February 2016 30	Portsmouth	3–1	Bristol Rovers	Portsmouth
15:00 GMT	Evans 19'; Smith 45+3'; McNulty 77'	Report	(yellow card) 25' Easter; (yellow card) 39' (goal) 90+1' Brown; (yellow card) 85' Montaño; (yellow card) 90+3' Lockyer	Stadium: Fratton Park; Attendance: 17,808; Referee: Trevor Kettle

20 February 2016 31	Yeovil Town	1–1	Portsmouth	Yeovil
15:00 GMT	Tozer (yellow card) 64'; Zoko 73'	Report	(yellow card) 80' (red card) 81' Burgess; 84' Roberts	Stadium: Huish Park; Attendance: 6,051; Referee: Mark Haywood

23 February 2016 32	Barnet	1–0	Portsmouth	Barnet
19:45 GMT	Champion (yellow card) 22'; Akinde 41' (pen.); Randall (yellow card) 59'; Yiadom (yellow card) 60'; Muggleton (yellow card) 66'	Report	(yellow card) 90+3' Webster	Stadium: The Hive; Attendance: 2,557; Referee: Phil Gibbs

27 February 2016 33	Portsmouth	2–1	Cambridge United	Portsmouth
15:00 GMT	McNulty 41' (yellow card) 90+5'; Webster 62'; Chaplin (yellow card) 87'	Report	(yellow card) 70' (goal) 90' Berry; (yellow card) 79' Legge	Stadium: Fratton Park; Attendance: 15,425; Referee: Oliver Langford

1 March 2016 34	Exeter City	1–1	Portsmouth	Exeter
19:45 GMT	Watkins 90'	Report	Chaplin 31'; Burgess (yellow card) 38'	Stadium: St James Park; Attendance: 3,855; Referee: Brendan Malone

5 March 2015 35	Stevenage	0–2	Portsmouth	Stevenage
15:00 GMT	Wilkinson (yellow card) 38'	Report	McNulty 22', (yellow card) 23'; Naismith 82'	Stadium: Broadhall Way; Attendance: 4,092; Referee: Kevin Johnson

8 March 2015 26	Accrington Stanley	1–3	Portsmouth	Accrington
19:45 GMT	McCartan 83'	Report	Bennett 22'; Pearson 36' (o.g.); Doyle 43'	Stadium: Crown Ground; Attendance: 1,841; Referee: Chris Sarginson

12 March 2016 36	Portsmouth	0–3	Newport County	Portsmouth
15:00 GMT	Stevens (yellow card) 24'; Hollands (yellow card) 34'; Burgess (yellow card) 40'; Roberts (yellow card) 53' (yellow-red card) 59'	Report	Byrne (yellow card) 21'; Jones 34'; Boden 69'; O'Sullivan (yellow card) 82'; Morgan 87'	Stadium: Fratton Park; Attendance: 16,245; Referee: Ben Toner

19 March 2016 37	Mansfield Town	1–1	Portsmouth	Mansfield
15:00 GMT	Green 26', (yellow card) 31'; Dieseruvwe (yellow card) 28'; Rose (yellow card) 30'	Report	Tafazolli 43' (o.g.); Stevens (yellow card) 66'	Stadium: Field Mill; Attendance: 3,980; Referee: Carl Boyeson

25 March 2016 38	Portsmouth	4–0	Notts County	Portsmouth
15:00 GMT	Bennett 44', 49'; Hollands (yellow card) 45'; Burgess 81'; McNulty 90+1'	Report	(yellow card) 5' Aborah; (yellow card) 40' Milsom; (yellow card) 45+3' Thompson; (yellow card) 74' Smith; (yellow card) 90' McLeod	Stadium: Fratton Park; Attendance: 16,670; Referee: Michael Bull

2 April 2016 40	Portsmouth	1–0	Carlisle United	Portsmouth
15:00 GMT	Stevens (yellow card) 44'; Smith 57'	Report	(yellow card) 73' Raynes	Stadium: Fratton Park; Attendance: 15,416; Referee: Charles Breakspear

9 April 2016 41	Dagenham & Redbridge	1–4	Portsmouth	Dagenham
15:00 GMT	Hemmings 34'; Passley (yellow card) 45+2'; Doidge (yellow card) 67'; Hoyte (yellow card) 79'	Report	(yellow card) 45+1' (goal) 59' Doyle; (yellow card) 58' Smith; 68' Burgess; (yellow card) 77' Clarke; 85' Evans; 88' Bennett	Stadium: Victoria Road; Attendance: 3,122; Referee: Lee Collins

16 April 2016 42	Portsmouth	1–2	Plymouth Argyle	Portsmouth
15:00 GMT	Smith 37'; Doyle (yellow card) 48'; Burgess (yellow card) 61'	Report	(yellow card) 19' McCormick; (yellow card) 35' McHugh; (yellow card) 50' Hartley; 86' Matt; 86' Wylde	Stadium: Fratton Park; Attendance: 18,423; Referee: Chris Sarginson

19 April 2016 43	York City	3–1	Portsmouth	York
19:45 GMT	Fewster 30'; Alessandra 34'; Summerfield 48' (yellow card) 63'; Carson (yellow card) 86'	Report	(yellow card) 58' Davies; 55' Evans	Stadium: Bootham Crescent; Attendance: 3,214; Referee: Nigel Miller

23 April 2016 44	Portsmouth	2–1	Wycombe Wanderers	Portsmouth
15:00 GMT	Roberts 37'; Chaplin 67' (yellow card) 90+5'	Report	(yellow card) 48' Stewart; 73' Jombati; (yellow card) 80' Bean	Stadium: Fratton Park; Attendance: 16,187; Referee: Dean Whitestone

26 April 2016 39	AFC Wimbledon	0–1	Portsmouth	Kingston upon Thames
19:45 GMT	Elliott (yellow card) 31'; Robinson (yellow card) 53'; C. Smith (yellow card) 89'	Report	(yellow card) 24' Roberts; (yellow card) 27' (goal) 35' M. Smith	Stadium: Kingsmeadow; Attendance: 4,799; Referee: Andy Madley

30 April 2016 45	Hartlepool United	0–2	Portsmouth	Hartlepool
15:00 GMT	Jones (yellow card) 24'	Report	(yellow card) 36' Freeman; 56' Naismith; 84' Chaplin	Stadium: Victoria Park; Attendance: 5,046; Referee: Eddie Ilderton

7 May 2016 46	Portsmouth	1–2	Northampton Town	Portsmouth
15:00 GMT	Davies (yellow card) 38'; Freeman (red card) 47'; Naismith 48'; McGurk (yellow card) 69'; Evans (yellow card) 75'	Report	14' (o.g.) Whatmough; (yellow card) 45' D'Ath; 81' Collins	Stadium: Fratton Park; Attendance: 18,746; Referee: Mark Brown

=== FA Cup ===
7 November 2015 First round	Portsmouth	2–1	Macclesfield Town	Portsmouth
15:00 GMT	McGurk 3', 45'	Report	Dennis 15'	Stadium: Fratton Park; Attendance: 9,834; Referee: Lee Swabey

5 December 2015 Second round	Portsmouth	1–0	Accrington Stanley	Portsmouth
15:00 GMT	McGurk 21'	Report		Stadium: Fratton Park; Attendance: 9,258; Referee: Kevin Johnson

9 January 2016 Third round	Ipswich Town	2–2	Portsmouth	Ipswich
15:00 GMT	Oar 53'; Fraser 88'	Report	Bennett 55'; Chaplin 86'	Stadium: Portman Road; Attendance: 17,020; Referee: David Coote

19 January 2016 Third round replay	Portsmouth	2–1	Ipswich Town	Portsmouth
19:45 GMT	Roberts 32' (pen.); McNulty 37'	Report	Malarczyk (yellow card) 14' (yellow-red card) 77'; Maitland-Niles 60'	Stadium: Fratton Park; Attendance: 15,179; Referee: Andy Woolmer

30 January 2016 Fourth round	Portsmouth	1–2	Bournemouth	Portsmouth
15:00 GMT	Burgess (yellow card) 22'; Roberts 43'	Report	King 71'; Pugh 83'; O'Kane (yellow card) 90+3'	Stadium: Fratton Park; Attendance: 18,901; Referee: Mike Dean

=== League Cup ===
On 16 June 2015, the first round draw was made, Portsmouth were drawn at home against Derby County. In the second round, Portsmouth were drawn at home again this time against Reading.

12 August 2015 First round	Portsmouth	2–1	Derby County	Portsmouth
19:45 BST	McGurk 49'; Chaplin 76'	Report	Shackell 73'	Stadium: Fratton Park; Attendance: 11,573; Referee: Paul Tierney

25 August 2015 Second round	Portsmouth	1–2	Reading	Portsmouth
19:45 BST	Chaplin 40'	Report	Blackman 64'; McCleary 84'	Stadium: Fratton Park; Attendance: 18,190; Referee: Gavin Ward

=== Football League Trophy ===
On 8 August 2015, live on Soccer AM the draw for the first round of the Football League Trophy was drawn by Toni Duggan and Alex Scott. Pompey travelled to Exeter City.

1 September 2015 First round	Exeter City	2–0	Portsmouth	Exeter
19:45 BST	Harley 54' (pen.); Nicholls 72'	Report		Stadium: St James Park; Attendance: 2,323; Referee: Lee Swabey

=== Football League play-offs ===
12 May 2016 First leg	Portsmouth	2–2	Plymouth Argyle	Portsmouth
19:45 BST	McNulty 3'; Hollands (yellow card) 40'; Barton (yellow card) 45+4'; Roberts 51' (pen.)	Report	9' 19' Matt; (yellow card) 14' Carey; (yellow card) 50' Hartley; (yellow card) 60' Sawyer; (yellow card) 85' Purrington	Stadium: Fratton Park; Attendance: 17,622; Referee: Oliver Langford

15 May 2016 Second leg	Plymouth Argyle	1–0	Portsmouth	Plymouth
18:00 BST	McHugh (yellow card) 29'; Hartley 90+1'	Report	(yellow card) 71' Close	Stadium: Home Park; Attendance: 15,011; Referee: Paul Tierney
