= Ben Tollitt =

English footballer (born 1994)

Personal information
- Full name: Benjamin Lee Tollitt
- Date of birth: 30 November 1994 (age 31)
- Place of birth: Liverpool, England
- Height: 1.82 m (6 ft 0 in)
- Positions: Winger; forward

Team information
- Current team: Morecambe
- Number: 18

Youth career
- –2013: Everton

Senior career*
Years	Team	Apps	(Gls)
2013–2015	Widnes	27	(11)
2014–2015	→ Skelmersdale United (dual registration)	13	(1)
2015–2016	Portsmouth	12	(1)
2016	→ Tranmere Rovers (loan)	10	(3)
2016–2019	Tranmere Rovers	24	(3)
2018–2019	→ Wrexham (loan)	13	(4)
2019–2020	Blackpool	0	(0)
2019–2020	→ Wrexham (loan)	12	(0)
2020	Macclesfield Town	5	(0)
2020–2022	AFC Fylde	53	(15)
2022–2024	Oldham Athletic	41	(8)
2023	→ Kidderminster Harriers (loan)	6	(0)
2024	→ Chester (loan)	13	(4)
2024-2026	Morecambe	43	(7)
2026-	FC Halifax Town	1	(0)
- * Club domestic league appearances and goals as of 15:04, 11 August 2026 (UTC)

Benjamin Lee Tollitt (born 30 November 1994) is an English professional footballer who plays as a winger for National League club FC Halifax Town..

== Career ==
=== Widnes / Skelmersdale United ===
Born in Liverpool, Tollitt joined Widnes in the summer of 2013 after being released by Everton. He made his starting debut for the club on 25 September.

Tollitt scored his first goal in a 1–4 home defeat to Atherton Collieries. He finished his first senior season with 23 league appearances and eight goals.

On 27 September 2014, Tollitt scored a hat-trick in a 4–2 home win against Daisy Hill. In November, he joined Skelmersdale United in a dual-registration deal, making his debut for the club in a 1–1 draw against Grantham Town.

=== Portsmouth ===
In July 2015, Tollitt went on a trial at Portsmouth, making a four-minute appearance in the club's pre-season friendly against Havant & Waterlooville. On 15 July he signed a one-year deal with Pompey, with an option of an extension.

Tollitt made his professional debut on 12 August, coming off the bench in a 2–1 Football League Cup home win against Derby County. He scored his first goal for Portsmouth in a 6–0 win over York City on 24 November 2015.

==== Tranmere Rovers (loan) ====
In September 2016, Tollitt joined Tranmere Rovers on loan from Portsmouth.

=== Tranmere Rovers ===
On 9 December, he signed a permanent deal with Rovers, running until 2019.

On 21 December 2018, Tollitt joined National League side Wrexham on a short-term loan.

He was released by Tranmere at the end of the 2018–19 season.

=== Blackpool ===
On 21 June 2019, he signed a two-year contract, plus a 12-month option, with Blackpool.

On 23 August 2019, Tollitt rejoined Wrexham on an initial short-term loan.

He was released by the club on 30 January 2020. Following his release he joined Macclesfield Town.

=== Oldham Athletic ===
In July 2022, Tollitt signed for newly relegated National League club Oldham Athletic on a one-year deal having spent the previous two seasons with National League North side AFC Fylde.

On 7 November 2023, Tollitt joined National League club Kidderminster Harriers on loan.

=== Morecambe ===
Tollitt was one of 15 free agents who signed for League Two club Morecambe on 12 July 2024, after the club's embargo on registering new players was lifted. On 16 May 2026, Morecambe announced he was being released.

== Personal life ==
He is studying for a degree in Physiotherapy at the University of Salford.

== Career statistics ==
As of match played 28 July 2025

Appearances and goals by club, season and competition
Club	Season	Division	League		FA Cup		League Cup		Other		Total	
Club	Season	Division	Apps	Goals	Apps	Goals	Apps	Goals	Apps	Goals	Apps	Goals
Widnes	2013–14	NWCFL Division One	12	3	0	0	0	0	1 (Note: Appearance(s) in NWCFL First Division Challenge Cup)	0	13	3
Widnes	2014–15	NWCFL Division One	15	8	0	0	1	0	3 (Note: One appearance in FA Vase, one appearance and one goal in NWCFL First Division Challenge Cup, one appearance and goal in Liverpool Senior Cup)	2	19	10
Widnes	Total		27	11	0	0	1	0	4	2	32	13
Skelmersdale United (dual reg)	2014–15	NPL Premier Division	13	1	0	0	0	0	0	0	13	1
Portsmouth	2015–16	League Two	12	1	1	0	2	0	1 (Note: Appearance(s) in EFL Trophy)	0	16	1
Portsmouth	2016–17	League Two	0	0	0	0	1	0	1	0	2	0
Portsmouth	Total		12	1	1	0	3	0	2	0	18	1
Tranmere Rovers	2016–17	National League	18	6	1	0	—		3 (Note: Appearance(s) in FA Trophy)	0	22	6
Tranmere Rovers	2017–18	National League	12	0	0	0	—		0	0	12	0
Tranmere Rovers	2018–19	League Two	4	0	2	0	1	0	3	0	10	0
Tranmere Rovers	Total		34	6	3	0	1	0	6	0	44	6
Wrexham (loan)	2018–19	National League	13	4	0	0	—		1	0	14	4
Blackpool	2019–20	League One	0	0	—		0	0	0	0	0	0
Wrexham (loan)	2018–19	National League	12	0	2	0	—		3 (Note: One appearance in FA Trophy, two appearances and one goal in Scottish Challenge Cup)	1	17	1
Macclesfield Town	2019–20	League Two	5	0	0	0	0	0	0	0	5	0
AFC Fylde	2020–21	National League North	15	6	4	2	—		1	0	20	8
AFC Fylde	2021–22	National League North	38	9	2	0	—		1	0	41	9
AFC Fylde	Total		53	15	6	2	—		2	0	61	17
Oldham Athletic	2022–23	National League	36	7	3	1	—		1	0	40	8
Oldham Athletic	2023–24	National League	5	1	1	0	—		0	0	6	1
Oldham Athletic	Total		41	8	4	1	—		1	0	46	9
Kidderminster Harriers (loan)	2023–24	National League	6	0	—		—		1	0	7	0
Chester (loan)	2023–24	National League North	13	4	—		—		0	0	13	4
Morecambe	2024–25	League Two	39	6	3	0	1	0	4	2	47	8
Career total			268	56	19	4	5	0	24	5	217	64
