= Christian Oxlade-Chamberlain =

English footballer (born 1998)

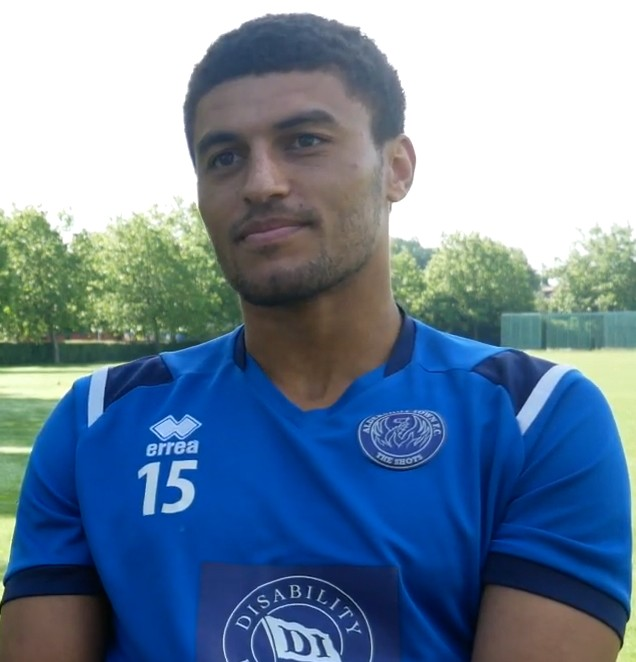
- Oxlade-Chamberlain with Aldershot Town in 2021

Personal information
- Full name: Christian Benjamin Oxlade-Chamberlain
- Date of birth: 24 June 1998 (age 28)
- Place of birth: Portsmouth, England
- Height: 6 ft 2 in (1.87 m)
- Positions: Right-back; centre-back

Team information
- Current team: Truro City

Youth career
- 2014–2015: Portsmouth

Senior career*
Years	Team	Apps	(Gls)
2015–2018	Portsmouth	0	(0)
2016	→ Wimborne Town (loan)	2	(0)
2016	→ Salisbury (loan)	5	(1)
2016–2017	→ Eastbourne Borough (loan)	24	(3)
2017	→ Poole Town (loan)	6	(1)
2017–2018	→ Oxford City (loan)	20	(2)
2018–2020	Notts County	3	(0)
2019	→ Ilkeston Town (loan)	2	(0)
2020–2021	Gosport Borough	7	(1)
2021–2022	Aldershot Town	40	(0)
2022–2023	King's Lynn Town	31	(3)
2023–2025	Kidderminster Harriers	26	(0)
2024–2025	→ Truro City (loan)	45	(2)
2025–	Truro City	30	(2)
- * Club domestic league appearances and goals as of 16:18, 7 July 2025 (UTC)

Christian Benjamin Oxlade-Chamberlain (born 24 June 1998) is an English professional footballer who plays as a right-back and centre-back for National League South club Truro City.

== Club career ==
=== Portsmouth ===
Born in Portsmouth, Oxlade-Chamberlain progressed through Portsmouth's youth categories. He signed a two-year scholarship contract on 4 July 2014.

Oxlade-Chamberlain made his professional debut on 1 September 2015, coming on as a substitute for Adam McGurk in a 0–2 Football League Trophy away defeat against Exeter City. He spent the rest of the year in the academy finishing the season with 30 appearances and 3 goals. In January 2016, he was loaned for a month to Wimborne Town in the Southern Football League Division One South & West.

On 25 April 2016, Oxlade-Chamberlain was offered a one-year professional contract with academy manager Mark Kelly stating "Christian's a bit of a late developer, as he's younger than the rest of the lads in that age group. He's come on a lot this year and is developing physically – he's a powerful lad and we're seeing more consistent displays from him."

In August 2016 he was loaned in by Steve Claridge, manager of Salisbury, again in the eighth tier. Two months later he was loaned to Eastbourne Borough in the National League South, who extended his services to the end of the season.

Poole Town, also of the sixth tier, brought in Oxlade-Chamberlain and Pompey teammate Jez Bedford for a month in August 2017. Later that season, he had two loan spells at Oxford City in the same league, both being curtailed by injury crises at his parent club, though he did not make any further appearances for them.

=== Notts County ===
On 18 July 2018, Oxlade-Chamberlain completed a transfer to League Two club Notts County, signing a two-year contract, with effect from 1 August. He made his debut on 4 September in an EFL Trophy 2–1 loss at Grimsby Town, playing the full 90 minutes in Harry Kewell's first match as manager. Four days later he played for the first time in a professional league in a 5–1 loss at Exeter City, in which he gave away a penalty for handball. He did not play again until New Year's Day when he came on at half time for Matt Tootle at Oldham Athletic and was sent off at the end of a 2–0 loss.

=== Non League ===
After the Magpies' relegation to the National League, Oxlade-Chamberlain played only the season opening 1–0 loss to Eastleigh before leaving for Ilkeston Town of the Northern Premier League Division One South East on a month's loan on 29 November 2019. He was released by the Magpies in June 2020.

On 19 September 2020, he joined Gosport Borough of the Southern Football League.

Oxlade-Chamberlain signed for National League side, Aldershot Town on 11 August 2021.

On 4 November 2022, King's Lynn Town announced they had signed Oxlade-Chamberlain after he had left Aldershot Town on 1 July 2022. He made his first appearance for the club in a 1–0 FA Cup win against League Two side Doncaster Rovers, being subbed on in the 82nd minute.

On 27 June 2023, Oxlade-Chamberlain penned a two-year deal with Kidderminster Harriers F.C. On 9 August 2024, he joined Truro City on a three-month loan deal.

On 6 July 2025, Oxlade-Chamberlain returned to Truro City on a two-year deal having helped the club to promotion to the National League.

== Personal life ==
Oxlade-Chamberlain's paternal grandparents emigrated to England from Jamaica. His elder brother, Alex, is also a footballer who signed for Scottish Premiership team Celtic in early 2026 and has played for Arsenal and Liverpool, and represented England at international level. Their father Mark represented Portsmouth and England in the 1980s and 1990s, while their uncle Neville was also a professional footballer.

== Career statistics ==
As of match played 26 April 2025

Appearances and goals by club, season and competition
Club	Season	League			FA Cup		League Cup		Other		Total	
Club	Season	Division	Apps	Goals	Apps	Goals	Apps	Goals	Apps	Goals	Apps	Goals
Portsmouth	2015–16	EFL League Two	0	0	0	0	0	0	1 (Note: Appearances in EFL Trophy)	0	1	0
Portsmouth	2016–17	EFL League Two	0	0	0	0	0	0	0	0	0	0
Portsmouth	2017–18	EFL League One	0	0	0	0	0	0	0	0	0	0
Portsmouth	Total		0	0	0	0	0	0	1	0	0	0
Wimborne Town (loan)	2015–16	Southern League Division One South & West	2	0	0	0	–		0	0	2	0
Salisbury (loan)	2016–17	Southern League Division One South & West	5	1	2	0	–		0	0	7	1
Eastbourne Borough (loan)	2016–17	National League South	24	3	0	0	–		5	0	29	3
Poole Town (loan)	2017–18	National League South	6	1	0	0	–		0	0	6	1
Oxford City (loan)	2017–18	National League South	20	2	1	0	–		2 (Note: 1 appearance in FA Trophy, 1 appearance in Oxfordshire Senior Cup)	0	23	2
Notts County	2018–19	EFL League Two	2	0	0	0	0	0	1	0	3	0
Notts County	2019–20	National League	1	0	0	0	–		0	0	1	0
Notts County	Total		3	0	0	0	0	0	1	0	4	0
Ilkeston Town (loan)	2019–20	Northern Premier League Division One South East	3	0	0	0	–		0	0	3	0
Gosport Borough	2020–21	Southern League Premier Division South	7	1	0	0	–		1 (Note: Appearances in FA Trophy)	0	8	1
Aldershot Town	2021–22	National League	40	0	1	0	–		1	0	42	0
King's Lynn Town	2022–23	National League North	32	3	2	0	–		1	0	35	3
Kidderminster Harriers	2023–24	National League	26	0	2	0	–		2 (Note: 1 appearances in Worcestershire Senior Cup, 1 appearance in FA Trophy)	0	30	0
Truro City (loan)	2024–25	National League South	45	2	0	0	–		1	0	46	2
Career total			213	13	8	0	0	0	15	0	236	13

== Honours ==
Truro City

- National League South: 2024–25

Individual

- National League South Team of the Season: 2024–25
