= Kaleem Haitham =

English footballer (born 1998)

Personal information
- Full name: Kaleem Haitham
- Date of birth: 4 June 1998 (age 28)
- Place of birth: Portsmouth, England
- Position: Winger

Team information
- Current team: Moneyfields

Youth career
- 2014–2016: Portsmouth

Senior career*
Years	Team	Apps	(Gls)
2015–2016	Portsmouth	0	(0)
2016	→ Wimborne Town (loan)	3	(0)
2016–2017	Folland Sports		
2017–2025	Chichester City		
2019	Bognor Regis Town (DR)	1	(0)
2021	Moneyfields (DR)	2	(0)
2025–	Moneyfields		
- * Club domestic league appearances and goals as of 01:30, 5 August 2026 (UTC)

Kaleem Haitham (born 4 June 1998) is an English footballer who plays for Moneyfields as a winger.

== Club career ==
Born in Portsmouth, Haitham progressed through Portsmouth's youth categories. He signed a two-year scholarship contract on 4 July 2014.

Haitham made his professional debut on 1 September 2015, coming on as a late substitute for fellow youth graduate Brandon Haunstrup in a 0–2 Football League Trophy away defeat against Exeter City.

After being released by Pompey, Haitham joined Folland Sports. In 2017, he moved to Chichester City.

== Career statistics ==
As of match played 30 January 2016.

Club	Season	League		FA Cup		League Cup		Other		Total	
Club	Season	Apps	Goals	Apps	Goals	Apps	Goals	Apps	Goals	Apps	Goals
Portsmouth	2015–16	0	0	0	0	0	0	1	0	1	0
Wimborne Town (loan)	2015–16	3	0	0	0	0	0	0	0	3	0
Total		3	0	0	0	0	0	1	0	4	0
