= Amine Linganzi =

Congolese footballer (born 1989)

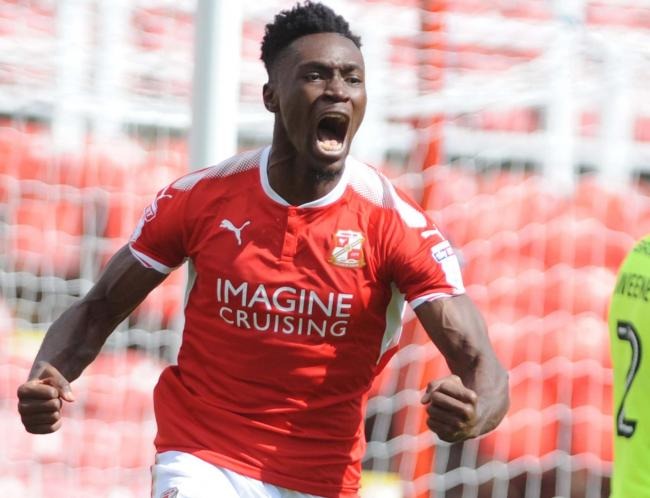
- Linganzi with Swindon Town

Personal information
- Full name: Amine Linganzi Koumba
- Date of birth: 16 November 1989 (age 37)
- Place of birth: Algiers, Algeria
- Height: 6 ft 2 in (1.88 m)
- Position: Midfielder

Youth career
- 2006–2008: Saint-Étienne

Senior career*
Years	Team	Apps	(Gls)
2008–2010	Saint-Étienne	3	(0)
2010–2013	Blackburn Rovers	2	(0)
2011	→ Preston North End (loan)	1	(0)
2013	Accrington Stanley	13	(0)
2013–2015	Gillingham	27	(1)
2015–2016	Fréjus Saint-Raphaël	3	(0)
2016–2017	Portsmouth	19	(1)
2017–2018	Swindon Town	25	(2)
2019	Salford City	4	(0)
Total		97	(4)

International career
2008–2013	Congo	4	(0)
- * Club domestic league appearances and goals

Amine Linganzi Koumba (born 16 November 1989) is a former professional footballer who played as a midfielder. Born in Algeria, Linganzi represented Congo at international level.

== Club career ==
Born in Algiers, Algeria, Linganzi emigrated to Aix-en-Provence, France, along with his parents. He played for several youths team such as Aix-en-Provence, Vitrolles and Cannes before joining Saint-Étienne, where Linganzi started his professional career. In the reserves for the 2007–08 season, Linganzi began to be established in the starting eleven with 22 appearances and one goal.

On 28 September 2008, Linganzi made his Ligue 1 debut for Saint-Étienne, coming on in the 64th minute for Geoffrey Dernis in a league game against Bordeaux.

On 28 January 2010, Linganzi signed a three-and-a-half-year contract with Blackburn Rovers on a free transfer. In only his second game for Blackburn Rovers's Reserve team when during a game against Wigan Athletic's reserve team, he provided two assists for goals and scored one goal.

On 13 January 2011, Linganzi signed for Preston North End on loan until the end of the 2010–11 season. He made his debut against Leicester City and after about half an hour he pulled his hamstring when he had a shot. His injury ruled him out for six weeks. Despite being injured, Manager Phil Brown confirmed that Linganzi would stay for the rest of the season and at the end of the season, Linganzi would be left out of the first team. In March, Brown said Linganzi still had a role in the first team, having been out for two months.

At the start of the 2011–12 season, Linganzi played in a pre-season friendly for Preston North End against Morecambe, prompting speculation that another loan deal had been agreed. He scored for North End in a trial against Wigan Athletic in a 3–1 defeat, with a volley in pre-season. However, the loan move did not materialise.

On 30 January 2013, Linganzi mutually agreed to terminate his contract with Blackburn Rovers. After leaving Blackburn, Linganzi had a trial with League Two side Accrington Stanley. After the trial, Linganzi won a contract with Accrington Stanley until the end of the season, on 21 February 2013. Upon the move, Linganzi said he had no regrets about joining Blackburn Rovers. He made his debut for the club in a 4–0 win over AFC Wimbledon on 19 March 2013. Following a 1–0 win over Wycombe Wanderers, Manager Leam Richardson dedicated the match to Linganzi following a family tragedy, which led him to go back to France. Richardson would credit Linganzi, along with many players, for their role to keep the club safe from relegation.

On 10 June 2013, Linganzi signed for League Two champions Gillingham on a two-year contract. Manager Martin Allen said upon signing him "Before his injuries, it looked like he was heading for the top, and now he is fully recovered, I believe we have a player who can helps us march onwards and upwards. He is a midfield player, he is massive and he was the best central midfield player that played at Priestfield last season. He will prove to be a good signing". He scored his first goal for Gillingham on 22 March 2014 in a 3–1 home defeat against Crewe Alexandra. He left the club by mutual consent on 10 March 2015.

On 24 July 2015, Linganzi signed for French Championnat National side Étoile Fréjus Saint-Raphaël.

On 8 August 2016, Linganzi signed for League Two team Portsmouth on a one-month contract. He made his debut for the club in the EFL Cup defeat to Coventry City the following day. He scored his first goal for Portsmouth against Carlisle United in a 3–0 away win.

On 29 June 2017, Linganzi joined fellow League Two side Swindon Town. On the opening day of the 2017–18 campaign, Linganzi made his Swindon debut in their 2–1 away victory against Carlisle United, featuring for the entire 90 minutes. On 14 October 2017, Linganzi scored his first goal for Swindon during their 3–1 away victory against Mansfield Town, converting Matt Taylor's cross in the 4th minute.

On 9 June 2018, via his Twitter page, Linganzi announced that he would be leaving the club, despite being offered a new deal.

In January 2019 he joined Salford City until the end of the season after training with the club for two weeks ahead of transfer deadline day. He made his debut for the club in an FA Trophy match against Maidstone United on 5 February. He was released by the club at the end of the season after the expiry of his current deal.

== International career ==
Although born in Algeria and holding French nationality, Linganzi represented Congo internationally. He made his debut in the 3–0 loss against Algeria, his country of birth, on 14 August 2013, during which he was substituted due to a hamstring injury.

== Career statistics ==
As of match played 5 May 2018

Club	Season	League			National cup		League cup		Other		Total	
Club	Season	Division	Apps	Goals	Apps	Goals	Apps	Goals	Apps	Goals	Apps	Goals
Saint-Étienne	2008–09	Ligue 1	3	0	0	0	0	0	1 (Note: Appearance(s) in UEFA Europa League)	0	4	0
Blackburn Rovers	2009–10	Premier League	1	0	0	0	0	0	—		1	0
Blackburn Rovers	2010–11	Premier League	1	0	1	0	1	0	—		3	0
Blackburn Rovers	Total		2	0	1	0	1	0	—		4	0
Preston North End (loan)	2011–12	Championship	1	0	0	0	0	0	—		1	0
Accrington Stanley	2012–13	League Two	13	0	0	0	0	0	0	0	13	0
Gillingham	2013–14	League One	20	1	0	0	0	0	0	0	20	1
Gillingham	2014–15	League One	7	0	0	0	0	0	1 (Note: Appearance(s) in Football League Trophy)	0	8	0
Gillingham	Total		27	1	0	0	0	0	1	0	28	1
Fréjus Saint-Raphaël	2015–16	Championnat National	3	0	0	0	—		—		3	0
Portsmouth	2016–17	League Two	19	1	0	0	1	0	3 (Note: Appearance(s) in EFL Trophy)	0	23	1
Swindon Town	2017–18	League Two	25	2	2	2	0	0	2	0	29	4
Career total			93	4	3	2	2	0	7	0	105	6

== Honours ==
Portsmouth

- EFL League Two: 2016–17
