= Brandon Haunstrup =

English footballer (born 1996)

Personal information
- Full name: Brandon Neil Haunstrup
- Date of birth: 26 October 1996 (age 30)
- Place of birth: Waterlooville, England
- Height: 1.83 m (6 ft 0 in)
- Position: Left-back

Team information
- Current team: AFC Totton

Youth career
- Portsmouth

Senior career*
Years	Team	Apps	(Gls)
2015–2020	Portsmouth	32	(0)
2015	→ Bognor Regis Town (loan)	1	(0)
2016	→ Sutton United (loan)	3	(0)
2020–2022	Kilmarnock	44	(0)
2022–2024	Cambridge United	8	(0)
2024	→ Gateshead (loan)	1	(0)
2024–2025	Gateshead	9	(1)
2025–	AFC Totton	0	(0)
- * Club domestic league appearances and goals as of 10:42, 5 August 2025 (UTC)

Brandon Neil Haunstrup (born 26 October 1996) is an English professional footballer who plays as a defender for AFC Totton.

== Career ==
=== Portsmouth ===
Born in Waterlooville, Haunstrup progressed through Portsmouth's youth categories. He was offered a two-year scholarship contract on 3 July 2013.

On 7 January 2015, Haunstrup joined Bognor Regis Town on a youth experience loan. He made his debut for the club a day later, starting in a 3–4 away loss against Leatherhead;

On 25 June 2015, Haunstrup signed a one-year professional deal with Portsmouth, being promoted to the main squad. He made his professional debut on 12 August, starting in a 2–1 Football League Cup home win against Derby County. On 13 April 2016, his contract was extended until the summer of 2017.

Having played against them in a pre-season friendly in July 2016, on 19 October 2016 it was announced that Haunstrup would join National League team Sutton United on loan for one month. On 22 October, Haunstrup made his first appearance for Sutton as a substitute in a 1–1 away draw against Southport. He made his first full appearance for Sutton three days later on 25 October, in a 2–2 draw at home against Maidstone United.

On 8 June 2017, Haunstrup signed a new one-year contract at Pompey with the club holding an option for a further 12 months. At the end of the 2017–18 season, the club took up the option and extended his contract for a further year. Following a successful breakthrough season, in which he made 20 appearances in all competitions, the club further rewarded Haunstrup with a new two-year contract, running until the summer of 2020.

=== Kilmarnock ===
On 22 July 2020, Scottish Premiership side Kilmarnock announced that they had signed Haunstrup on a two-year deal.

=== Cambridge United ===
On 6 July 2022, Haunstrup returned to England to join League One club Cambridge United on a two-year deal. On 19 April 2024, Haunstrup joined Gateshead on loan until the end of the season On 1 May 2024, Cambridge announced the player would be released when his contract expired.

=== Gateshead ===
On 13 August 2024, Haunstrup re-joined Gateshead on a one-year deal.

In June 2025, Haunstrup joined AFC Totton ahead of their first ever season in National League South.

== Career statistics ==
As of match played 20 April 2024

Appearances and goals by club, season and competition
Club	Season	League			FA Cup		League Cup		Other		Total	
Club	Season	Division	Apps	Goals	Apps	Goals	Apps	Goals	Apps	Goals	Apps	Goals
Portsmouth	2015–16	League Two	1	0	1	0	2	0	1	0	5	0
Portsmouth	2016–17	League Two	0	0	0	0	0	0	1	0	1	0
Portsmouth	2017–18	League One	16	0	1	0	1	0	2	0	20	0
Portsmouth	2018–19	League One	5	0	0	0	1	0	6	0	12	0
Portsmouth	2019–20	League One	10	0	2	1	3	0	4	0	19	1
Portsmouth	Total		32	0	4	1	7	0	14	0	57	1
Bognor Regis Town (loan)	2014–15	Isthmian Premier Division	1	0	0	0	0	0	0	0	1	0
Sutton United (loan)	2016–17	National League	3	0	0	0	0	0	0	0	3	0
Kilmarnock	2020–21	Scottish Premiership	27	0	2	0	3	0	2 (Note: Appearance(s) in Scottish Premiership play-offs)	1	34	1
Kilmarnock	2021–22	Scottish Championship	17	0	1	0	5	0	1 (Note: Appearance(s) in Scottish Challenge Cup)	0	24	0
Kilmarnock	Total		44	0	3	0	8	0	3	1	58	1
Cambridge United	2022–23	League One	5	0	0	0	2	0	1	0	8	0
Cambridge United	2023–24	League One	3	0	2	0	0	0	2	0	7	0
Cambridge United	Total		8	0	2	0	2	0	3	0	15	0
Gateshead (loan)	2023–24	National League	1	0	0	0	0	0	0	0	1	0
Career total			89	0	9	1	17	0	20	1	135	2

== Honours ==
Portsmouth

- EFL League Two: 2016–17
- EFL Trophy: 2018–19
