= Calvin Davies =

English footballer

Personal information
- Full name: Calvin Jack Davies
- Date of birth: 7 September 1997 (age 29)
- Place of birth: Portsmouth, England
- Height: 5 ft 6 in (1.68 m)
- Position: Right back

Team information
- Current team: AFC Portchester

Youth career
- 2014–2017: Portsmouth

Senior career*
Years	Team	Apps	(Gls)
2015–2017	Portsmouth	0	(0)
2015	→ Havant & Waterlooville (loan)	2	(0)
2016	→ Bognor Regis Town (loan)	5	(0)
2016–2017	→ Bognor Regis Town (loan)	30	(0)
2017–2025	Bognor Regis Town		
2025–	AFC Portchester	31	(0)
- * Club domestic league appearances and goals as of 01:23, 5 August 2026 (UTC)

Calvin Jack Davies (born 7 September 1997) is an English professional footballer who plays for AFC Portchester after starting his career at Portsmouth, he plays as a right back.

== Club career ==
=== Portsmouth ===
Born in Portsmouth, Davies progressed through Portsmouth's youth categories. He signed a two-year scholarship contract on 4 July 2014.

Davies made his professional debut on 1 September 2015, starting in a 0–2 Football League Trophy away defeat against Exeter City. On 25 September, he was loaned to Havant & Waterlooville, but appeared rarely.

On 25 January 2016, Davies was loaned to Bognor Regis Town. On 25 April, he signed a one-year professional deal with the club.

Davies was loaned to Bognor for the majority of the 2016-17 season where he featured in 30 games as Bognor finished 2nd and won promotion via the playoffs. On 10 May 2017, Portsmouth released a statement confirming that Davies would be released by the club at the end of his contract, a fact he already revealed a day before through his Twitter account., After training with Bristol City and Yeovil Town, Davies signed for 2017 National League South newcomers Bognor Regis Town F.C. after previously playing with them on a loan basis.

== Career statistics ==
As of match played 11 August 2018.

Club	Season	League		FA Cup		League Cup		Other		Total	
Club	Season	Apps	Goals	Apps	Goals	Apps	Goals	Apps	Goals	Apps	Goals
Portsmouth	2015–16	0	0	0	0	0	0	1	0	1	0
Havant and Waterlooville (loan)	2015–16	2	0	3	0	0	0	0	0	5	0
Bognor Regis Town (loan)	2015–16	5	0	0	0	0	0	7	0	12	0
Bognor Regis Town (loan)	2016–17	30	0	1	0	0	0	4	0	35	0
Bognor Regis Town	2017–18	37	0	3	0	0	0	5	0	45	0
Bognor Regis Town	2018–19	1	0	0	0	0	0	0	0	1	0
Career Total		75	0	7	0	0	0	17	0	99	0
