= Brandon Joseph-Buadi =

English footballer

Personal information
- Full name: Brandon Yaw Joseph-Buadi
- Date of birth: 2 October 1997 (age 29)
- Place of birth: Brighton, England
- Height: 1.85 m (6 ft 1 in)
- Position: Forward

Youth career
- 2004–2016: Portsmouth

College career
| Years | Team | Apps | (Gls) |
| 2017–2021 | Manhattan Jaspers | 68 | (17) |

Senior career*
| Years | Team | Apps | (Gls) |
| 2015–2016 | Portsmouth | 0 | (0) |
| 2016 | → Wimborne Town (loan) | 2 | (1) |
| 2016 | → Bognor Regis (loan) | 3 | (0) |
| 2016 | Worthing | 0 | (0) |
- * Club domestic league appearances and goals as of 14:18, 10 October 2018 (UTC)

Brandon Yaw Joseph-Buadi (born 2 October 1997) is an English former footballer who played as a forward.

== Club career ==
Born in Brighton, Joseph-Buadi joined Portsmouth's youth categories in 2004. He signed a two-year scholarship contract on 4 July 2014.

Joseph-Buadi made his professional debut on 1 September 2015, starting in a 0–2 Football League Trophy away defeat against Exeter City. He was released by Pompey the following May, after his scholarship ended.

On 10 August 2016, Joseph-Buadi joined Worthing, but left the club shortly after. In 2017 he moved to the United States, joining Manhattan College's Manhattan Jaspers.

== Career statistics ==
As of 10 October 2018.

| Club | Season | League | | FA Cup | | League Cup | | Other | | Total | |
| Club | Season | Apps | Goals | Apps | Goals | Apps | Goals | Apps | Goals | Apps | Goals |
|---|---|---|---|---|---|---|---|---|---|---|---|
| Portsmouth | 2015–16 | 0 | 0 | 0 | 0 | 0 | 0 | 1 | 0 | 1 | 0 |
| Wimborne Town (loan) | 2015–16 | 2 | 1 | 0 | 0 | 0 | 0 | 0 | 0 | 2 | 1 |
| Bognor Regis (loan) | 2015–16 | 3 | 0 | 0 | 0 | 0 | 0 | 0 | 0 | 3 | 0 |
| Manhattan Jaspers | 2017 | 15 | 4 | — | | | | | | 15 | 4 |
| Manhattan Jaspers | 2018 | 11 | 5 | — | | | | | | 11 | 5 |
| Manhattan Jaspers | Subtotal | 26 | 9 | — | | | | | | 26 | 9 |
| Total | | 31 | 10 | 0 | 0 | 0 | 0 | 1 | 0 | 32 | 10 |
