= Pompey Supporters Trust =

- Abbreviation: PST
- Formation: 23 December 2009
- Type: Official supporter's club
- Legal status: Constitutional supporters' trust
- Headquarters: Portsmouth
- Members: 2,300
- Chair: Ian Limb
- Affiliations: Football Supporters' Federation, Supporters Direct
- Website: pompeytrust.com

The Pompey Supporters Trust, or the PST, is a supporters' trust consisting of fans of Portsmouth F.C., an English professional football club. The prime role of the group is to represent the interests of Portsmouth F.C. The trust was also the club's majority owner from 2013 until 2017.

== History ==
The trust's first meeting was held in September 2009, after various people contacted supporters, talking about the possibility of starting a supporters' trust. On 23 December, the PST was finally created.

On 30 March 2012, after Portsmouth's successive relegations and administrations, the trust launched a bid to try to buy the club, initially asking supporters to donate a minimum of £100. In August, PST announced a new bid, and members of the UK Parliament urged Balram Chainrai (Portsmouth's previous owner) to reach a deal with the Trust. On 18 October 2012, PKF administrator Trevor Birch announced that the trust were named 'preferred bidders' ahead of Chainrai's Portpin.

On 15 November 2012, PST signed a conditional agreement with PKF, Portsmouth's administrators, to buy the club. The deal was delayed, however, due to Chainrai's refusal to reach an agreement to the sale of Fratton Park, the club's stadium. On 10 April 2013, a ruling by the High Court of Justice allowed the takeover to proceed. The PST then appointed Iain McInnes as the club's chairman. On 19 April 2013, the club came out of administration.

A year after taking over, the PST had 2,300 shareholders and raised around £2.5m through individual pledges of £1,000. On 29 September 2014, after almost 18 months in charge, PST declared that the club was debt-free after paying back all creditors and legacy payments to ex-players. On Saturday 17 December 2016, the Pompey Supporters Trust unveiled their 'Wall of Fame' plaques to the rear wall of the North Stand's exterior, featuring the names of all the 2,300 PST shareholders who had financially contributed to save Portsmouth FC from liquidation in 2013.

In May 2017, PST members voted to sell Portsmouth F.C. to The Tornante Company, an investment company owned by former Disney CEO Michael Eisner. The purchase was completed on 3 August 2017.

The PST remains active as an organization that represents the interests of supporters.

== See also ==
- Portsmouth F.C.
