= Portsmouth F.C. Reserves and Academy =

Coordinates: 50°52′02″N 0°58′27″W

Portsmouth F.C.
- Full name: Portsmouth F.C. XI and Academy
- Nicknames: Pompey; The Blues; The Blue Army
- Founded: 1898
- Ground: Langstone Sports Site, University of Portsmouth, Furze Lane, Portsmouth, England
- League: Football League Youth Alliance

Portsmouth F.C. XI and Academy comprise the reserve and academy footballers of Portsmouth F.C.

== Portsmouth XI ==
Previously called Portsmouth Reserves, the Portsmouth XI primarily consists of young players under the age of 23 who are no longer eligible for the academy but are still attempting to make the step up to the senior team. This team is used to give younger professional players and first team players returning from injury the opportunity to play and maintain or improve their match fitness, or for trialists at the club to impress in a match environment.

The club are currently opting out of fielding a competitive, league-based reserve team. Instead, young players have been sent out on loan to local non-league football clubs for first-team action, and several friendly matches are arranged throughout the season for players to play in. Players can freely move between the first team, XI or academy (depending on age and contract status).

== The Academy ==
Portsmouth were granted academy status at the beginning of the 2007/2008 season. In their first year as an academy side, they finished in a 4th-place position in the Premier League Academy Group A, beating some well-established academy sides such as those of Southampton and Crystal Palace. In the 2012-13 season, the Academy won the Football League Youth Alliance South East Conference.

The academy currently operates at the Category Three level. Academy players can be promoted into the XI or first team, but due to EPPP rules, will still remain on youth contracts until a professional contract is offered. They play in the Football League Youth Alliance South-West Division and also compete in the FA Youth Cup.

Currently, Toby Steward and Harry Clout are notable academy graduates in the first team squad.

== Academy team ==
As of 5 August 2026

Note: Flags indicate national team as defined under FIFA eligibility rules; some limited exceptions apply. Players may hold more than one non-FIFA nationality.

No.	Pos.	Nation	Player
—	GK	ENG	Reuben Allen
—	GK	ENG	Ethan Bell
—	GK	ENG	Karl Borsberry-Lewis
—	DF	ENG	Ben Philipson
44	DF	WAL	Ashton Sizer
—	DF	ENG	George Tregunna
—	DF	ENG	George Wilson
—	MF	ENG	Tadi Bare
—	MF	ENG	Cruz Connor
—	MF	NIR	Brandon Downey

No.	Pos.	Nation	Player
—	MF	ENG	Max Hammond
—	MF	ENG	Jakub Jablonski
—	MF	ENG	Julian Korsah
43	MF	ENG	Fraser Thomas
—	FW	ENG	Dane Bailey
—	FW	ENG	Billy Gillooly
—	FW	ENG	Dexter Lee
—	FW	ZIM	Elisha Pfupa
—	FW	ENG	Kyran Sylvanus

== Academy graduates (2009–present) ==
Academy graduates who are still playing for Portsmouth, including those currently on loan to other clubs, are highlighted in green.

Player	Current Club	Born	International Honours	Debut	Manager
Asmir Begović	Free agent	(Bosnia and Herzegovina) Trebinje	Full Bosnia caps	Age 21 v Sunderland, 18 May 2009	Paul Hart
Joel Ward	Free agent	(England) Emsworth		Age 19 v Hereford United, 26 August 2009	Paul Hart
Gauthier Mahoto	Retired	France		Age 17 v Hereford United, 26 August 2009	Paul Hart
Lenny Sowah	WTSV Concordia	(Germany) Hamburg	Germany U-19 caps	Age 17 v Blackburn Rovers, 3 April 2010	Avram Grant
Matt Ritchie	Retired	(England) Gosport	Full Scotland caps	Age 20 v Wigan Athletic, 14 April 2010	Avram Grant
Nadir Çiftçi	Retired	(Turkey) Karakoçan	Turkey U-19 caps	Age 18 v Coventry City, 7 August 2010	Steve Cotterill
Peter Gregory	Retired	(England) Eastbourne		Age 18 v Coventry City, 7 August 2010	Steve Cotterill
Marlon Pack	Portsmouth	(England) Portsmouth		Age 19 v Crystal Palace, 24 August 2010	Steve Cotterill
Tom Kilbey	Retired	(England) Leytonstone		Age 20 v Watford, 1 January 2011	Steve Cotterill
Ryan Williams	Bengaluru	(Australia) Subiaco	Full Australia cap	Age 17 v Middlesbrough, 6 August 2011	Steve Cotterill
Jason Pearce	Retired	(England) Hillingdon		Age 23 v Reading, 16 August 2011	Steve Cotterill
Adam Webster	Free agent	(England) West Wittering	England U-19 caps	Age 17 v West Ham United, 14 January 2012	Michael Appleton
Ashley Harris	Retired	(England) Waterlooville		Age 18 v Birmingham, 20 March 2012	Michael Appleton
Jack Maloney	Retired	(England) Ryde		Age 17 v Plymouth, 14 August 2012	Michael Appleton
Bradley Tarbuck	Poole Town	(England) Emsworth		Age 16 v Plymouth, 14 August 2012	Michael Appleton
Sam Magri	Sholing	(England) Portsmouth	Full Malta caps	Age 18 v Plymouth, 14 August 2012	Michael Appleton
Dan Butler	Stevenage	(England) Cowes		Age 17 v Plymouth, 14 August 2012	Michael Appleton
Jed Wallace	Bristol City	(England) Reading	England U-19 cap	Age 18 v Plymouth, 14 August 2012	Michael Appleton
Dan Thompson	AFC Croydon Athletic	(England) Wandsworth		Age 18 v Plymouth, 14 August 2012	Michael Appleton
George Colson	Cowes Sports	(England) Cowes	Wales U-16 caps	Age 18 v Plymouth, 14 August 2012	Michael Appleton
Alex Grant	Newcastle Jets	(England) Manchester	Australia U-17 Call-up	Age 18 v Plymouth, 14 August 2012	Michael Appleton
Andy Higgins	Retired	(Australia) Perth		Age 18 v Plymouth, 14 August 2012	Michael Appleton
Jack Compton	Cadoxton Barry	(Wales) Cardiff		Age 23 v AFC Bournemouth, 18 August 2012	Michael Appleton
Nick Awford	Baffins Milton Rovers	(England) Portsmouth		Age 18 vs Sheffield United, 20 April 2013	Guy Whittingham
Jack Whatmough	Huddersfield Town	(England) Gosport	England U-19 cap	Age 17 vs Southend United, 26 November 2013	Andy Awford
Ben Close	Free	(England) Portsmouth		Age 18 vs Yeovil Town, 2 September 2014	Andy Awford
Conor Chaplin	Leicester City	(England) Worthing		Age 17 vs Accrington Stanley, 13 December 2014	Andy Awford
Adam May	Chelmsford City	(England) Southampton		Age 17 vs Bury, 18 April 2015	Gary Waddock
Brandon Haunstrup	AFC Totton	(England) Waterlooville		Age 18 vs Derby County, 12 August 2015	Paul Cook
Calvin Davies	AFC Portchester	(England) Portsmouth		Age 17 vs Exeter City, 1 September 2015	Paul Cook
Brandon Joseph-Buadi	Retired	(England) Brighton		Age 17 vs Exeter City, 1 September 2015	Paul Cook
Christian Oxlade-Chamberlain	Truro City	(England) Port Solent		Age 17 vs Exeter City, 1 September 2015	Paul Cook
Kaleem Haitham	Moneyfields	(England) Portsmouth		Age 17 vs Exeter City, 1 September 2015	Paul Cook
Alex Bass	Peterborough United	(England) Huntingdon		Age 18 vs Coventry City, 9 August 2016	Paul Cook
Liam O'Brien	Retired	(England) Ruislip	England U-19 cap	Age 24 vs Yeovil Town, 30 August 2016	Paul Cook
Joe Hancott	Cowes Sports	(England) Isle of Wight		Age 16 vs Fulham U23, 16 August 2017	Kenny Jackett
Haji Mnoga	Patro Eisden	(England) Portsmouth	Full Tanzania caps	Age 16 vs Crawley Town, 9 October 2018	Kenny Jackett
Bradley Lethbridge	Colden Common	(England) Portsmouth		Age 18 vs Tottenham Hotspur U21, 13 November 2018	Kenny Jackett
Matt Casey	AFC Totton	(England) Portsmouth		Age 19 vs Arsenal U21, 4 December 2018	Kenny Jackett
Freddie Read	AFC Totton	(England) Portsmouth		Age 18 vs Arsenal U21, 4 December 2018	Kenny Jackett
Dan Smith	Dartford	(England) London		Age 19 vs Southend United, 8 January 2019	Kenny Jackett
Leon Maloney	Havant & Waterlooville	(England) Isle of Wight		Age 17 vs Southend United, 8 January 2019	Kenny Jackett
Josh Flint	Crawley Town	(England) Waterlooville		Age 18 vs Norwich City U21, 14 September 2019	Kenny Jackett
Eoin Teggart	Annagh United	(Northern Ireland) Ballynahinch	Northern Ireland U19 caps	Age 17 vs Norwich City U21, 14 September 2019	Kenny Jackett
Harvey Rew	Gosport Borough	(England) Gosport	Wales U17 caps	Age 17 vs Oxford United, 8 October 2019	Kenny Jackett
Charlie Bell	Andover New Street	(England) Portsmouth		Age 17 vs West Ham United U21, 10 November 2020	Kenny Jackett
Harrison Brook	Moneyfields	(England) Portsmouth		Age 17 vs West Ham United U21, 10 November 2020	Kenny Jackett
Harry Jewitt-White	Crusaders	(England) Portsmouth	Wales U19 caps	Age 16 vs West Ham United U21, 10 November 2020	Kenny Jackett
Harry Kavanagh	Havant & Waterlooville	(England) Portsmouth		Age 18 vs West Ham United U21, 10 November 2020	Kenny Jackett
Lee Suk-jae	Whitehawk	(South Korea) Seoul		Age 17 vs West Ham United U21, 10 November 2020	Kenny Jackett
Alfie Stanley	AFC Portchester	(England) Portsmouth		Age 18/19 vs West Ham United U21, 10 November 2020	Kenny Jackett
Gerard Storey	Warrenpoint Town	(Northern Ireland) Belfast	Northern Ireland U17 caps	Age 18 vs Cheltenham Town, 8 December 2020	Kenny Jackett
Alfie Bridgman	Moneyfields	(England) Portsmouth	Malta U21 caps	Age 16 vs Peterborough United, 12 January 2021	Kenny Jackett
Harvey Hughes	HFX Wanderers	(England) Lyndhurst		Age 17 vs Peterborough United, 12 January 2021	Kenny Jackett
Adam Payce	Hungerford Town	(England) Swindon		Age 17 vs Crystal Palace U21, 9 November 2021	Danny Cowley
Issiaga Kaba	AFC Portchester	(England) Andover		Age 17 vs Crystal Palace U21, 9 November 2021	Danny Cowley
Dan Gifford	Bognor Regis Town	(England) Portsmouth		Age 17 vs Crystal Palace U21, 9 November 2021	Danny Cowley
Harvey Laidlaw	Havant & Waterlooville	(England) Portsmouth		Age 16 vs Aston Villa U21, 4 October 2022	Danny Cowley
Brian Quarm	Free agent	(England) London		Age 16 vs Aston Villa U21, 4 October 2022	Danny Cowley
Josh Dockerill	Free agent	(England) Guildford		Age 17 vs AFC Wimbledon, 1 November 2022	Danny Cowley
Koby Mottoh	Moreirense	(England) Southwark		Age 16 vs Forest Green Rovers, 8 August 2023	John Mousinho
Mitch Aston	Havant & Waterlooville	(England) Portchester		Age 17 vs Gillingham, 10 October 2023	John Mousinho
Sam Folarin	Free agent	(England) London	Republic of Ireland U18 caps	Age 17 vs Leyton Orient, 7 November 2023	John Mousinho
Maxwell Hurst	Baffins Milton Rovers	(England) Portsmouth		Age 18 vs AFC Wimbledon, 19 December 2023	John Mousinho
Harry Clout	Free agent	(England)		Age 18 vs Wycombe Wanderers, 10 January 2025	John Mousinho
Tayo Singerr	Portsmouth	(England) Southampton		Age 17 vs Reading, 12 August 2025	John Mousinho

Information in the above table is current as of August 2026

== Other notable academy graduates ==
England

- Darren Anderton
- Gary O'Neil
- Shaun Cooper
- Lewis Buxton
- James Keene
- Paris Cowan-Hall
- Rowan Vine
- Alan Knight
- Aaron Flahavan
- Sammy Igoe

Wales

- Kit Symons

Republic of Ireland

- Marc Wilson

Bosnia and Herzegovina

- Asmir Begović

Guernsey

- Chris Tardif

Jamaica

- Deon Burton
- Darryl Powell
