= 2010–11 Portsmouth F.C. season =

Portsmouth
2010–11 season
- Chief executive officer: David Lampitt
- Manager: Steve Cotterill
- Stadium: Fratton Park
- Championship: 16th
- FA Cup: Third round
- League Cup: Third round
- Top goalscorer: League: David Nugent (13); All: David Nugent (14)
- Highest home attendance: 20,040 vs. Leeds Utd (22 January 2011)
- Lowest home attendance: 13,132 vs. Coventry City (12 April 2011)
- Average home league attendance: 16,586
Home colours	Away colours

The 2010–11 season was Portsmouth's first season in the EFL Championship after relegation from the Premier League at the end of the previous season.

== Season review ==
On 22 October, Portsmouth issued a statement declaring "it appears likely that the club will now be closed down and liquidated by the administrators", but Pompey creditor Alexandre Gaydamak announced the next day that he had reached an agreement that could save their future. It was revealed just hours later that Portsmouth had finally come out of administration.

== Players ==
=== First-team squad ===
Squad at end of season

Note: Flags indicate national team as defined under FIFA eligibility rules; some limited exceptions apply. Players may hold more than one non-FIFA nationality.

No.	Pos.	Nation	Player
1	GK	ENG	Jamie Ashdown
2	DF	ENG	Greg Halford (on loan from Wolverhampton Wanderers)
3	DF	ENG	Carl Dickinson (on loan from Stoke City)
4	MF	RSA	Aaron Mokoena (captain)
5	DF	BEL	Ritchie De Laet (on loan from Manchester United)
6	DF	ISL	Hermann Hreiðarsson
7	MF	IRL	Liam Lawrence (Note: Lawrence was born in Retford, England, but also qualified to represent the Republic of Ireland internationally through his grandfather and made his international debut for the Republic of Ireland in May 2009.)
8	MF	ENG	Hayden Mullins
9	FW	ENG	Danny Webber
10	FW	ENG	David Nugent
11	MF	ENG	Michael Brown
14	MF	ENG	Jonathan Hogg (on loan from Aston Villa)
17	MF	WAL	David Cotterill (on loan from Swansea City)

No.	Pos.	Nation	Player
18	FW	ENG	Dave Kitson
19	DF	ENG	James Bowles
20	DF	ENG	Joel Ward
22	MF	SCO	Richard Hughes
24	FW	TUR	Nadir Çiftçi (Note: Çiftçi was born in Karakoçan, Turkey, but also qualified to represent the Netherlands internationally and represented the Netherlands at U-17 level and Turkey at U-19 level.)
25	DF	SEN	Ibrahima Sonko (on loan from Stoke City)
27	FW	NGR	Nwankwo Kanu
33	DF	POR	Ricardo Rocha
36	MF	ENG	Tom Kilbey
37	GK	ENG	Darryl Flahavan
38	MF	ENG	Ellis Martin
39	MF	ENG	Peter Gregory

=== Left club during season ===
Note: Flags indicate national team as defined under FIFA eligibility rules; some limited exceptions apply. Players may hold more than one non-FIFA nationality.

No.	Pos.	Nation	Player
5	MF	ENG	Matt Ritchie (Note: Ritchie was born in Gosport, England, but also qualified to represent Scotland internationally through his father and made his international debut for Scotland in March 2015.) (to Swindon Town)
6	DF	IRL	Marc Wilson (Note: Wilson was born in Aghagallon, Northern Ireland, and represented Northern Ireland at U-15 level, but also qualified to represent the Republic of Ireland internationally and represented the Republic of Ireland at U-18, U-19 and U-21 level before making his international debut for the Republic of Ireland in February 2011.) (to Stoke City)
17	FW	NGR	John Utaka (to Montpellier)
21	FW	ENG	Tommy Smith (to Queens Park Rangers)

No.	Pos.	Nation	Player
23	MF	GHA	Kevin-Prince Boateng (Note: Boateng was born in West Berlin, West Germany (now Berlin, Germany), and represented Germany at U-19, U-20 and U-21 level, but also qualified to represent Ghana internationally through his father and made his international debut for Ghana in June 2010.) (to Genoa)
31	GK	ENG	Liam O'Brien (to Barnet)
40	MF	ENG	Marlon Pack (on loan to Cheltenham Town)

== Transfers ==
Portsmouth had previously stated that any contracts due to expire at the end of the 2009–10 season would not be renewed due to their financial problems, and that they hoped to sign a new squad on free transfers and sell their squad from last year. As it transpired, only five players were released, on 19 May 2010; ten others were offered new contracts.

=== In ===
Since Portsmouth were under a transfer embargo, they initially were not allowed to buy players or sign free agents as they could not guarantee the PFA that the wages for the players could be paid. The embargo was later lifted.

Number	Date	Position	Name	Club	Fee	Ref
25	28 July 2010	DF	(Senegal) Ibrahima Sonko	(England) Stoke City	Loan	
1	4 August 2010	GK	(England) Jamie Ashdown	Free agent	Free	
3	13 August 2010	DF	(England) Carl Dickinson	(England) Stoke City	Loan	
37	27 August 2010	GK	(England) Darryl Flahavan	Free agent	Free	
27	27 August 2010	FW	(Nigeria) Nwankwo Kanu	Free agent	Free	
18	31 August 2010	FW	(England) Dave Kitson	(England) Stoke City	Transfer	
7	31 August 2010	MF	(Republic of Ireland) Liam Lawrence	(England) Stoke City	Transfer	
6	2 October 2010	DF	(Iceland) Hermann Hreidarsson	Free agent	Free	
2	19 October 2010	DF	(England) Greg Halford	(England) Wolverhampton Wanderers	Loan	
5	14 January 2011	DF	(Belgium) Ritchie De Laet	(England) Manchester United	Loan	
14	25 January 2011	MF	(England) Jonathan Hogg	(England) Aston Villa	Loan	
17	17 February 2011	MF	(Wales) David Cotterill	(Wales) Swansea City	Loan	

=== Out ===
Number	Date	Position	Name	Club	Fee	Ref
33	19 May 2010	MF	(Greece) Angelos Basinas	(France) AC Arles-Avignon	Free	
16	19 May 2010	DF	(Republic of Ireland) Steve Finnan	Retired		
–	19 May 2010	FW	(The Gambia) Omar Koroma	Released	Free	
42	19 May 2010	MF	(England) Paris Cowan-Hall	(England) Scunthorpe United	Free	
38	19 May 2010	DF	(England) Callum Reynolds	(England) Basingstoke Town	Free	
46	6 July 2010	DF	(Germany) Lennard Sowah	(Germany) Hamburg	Free	
8	7 July 2010	MF	(Senegal) Papa Bouba Diop	(Greece) AEK Athens	Undisclosed	
25	7 July 2010	DF	(Serbia) Duško Tošić	(Serbia) Red Star Belgrade	Free	
39	8 July 2010	DF	(Algeria) Nadir Belhadj (Note: Belhadj was born in Saint-Claude, France, and represented France at U-18 level, but also qualified to represent Algeria internationally through his parents and made his international debut for Algeria in March 2004.)	(Qatar) Al Sadd	Undisclosed	
1	30 July 2010	GK	(England) David James	(England) Bristol City	Free	
26	3 August 2010	DF	(Israel) Tal Ben Haim	(England) West Ham United	Season-long loan	
23	18 August 2010	MF	(Ghana) Kevin-Prince Boateng	(Italy) Genoa	Undisclosed	
–	18 August 2010	MF	(Northern Ireland) Jordan Hughes	(Northern Ireland) Lisburn Distillery	Free	
–	18 August 2010	MF	(France) Gauthier Mahoto	Released	Free	
–	18 August 2010	MF	(France) Gaël N'Lundulu	Released	Free	
34	18 August 2010	FW	(Switzerland) Danijel Subotić (Note: Subotić was born in Zagreb, Yugoslavia (now Croatia), but also qualified to represent Switzerland internationally and represented Switzerland at U-19 level.)	(Italy) Grosseto	Free	
6	31 August 2010	MF	(Republic of Ireland) Marc Wilson	(England) Stoke City	Transfer	
21	31 August 2010	FW	(England) Tommy Smith	(England) Queens Park Rangers	Transfer	
29	31 August 2010	DF	(England) James Hurst	(England) West Bromwich Albion	Undisclosed	
40	31 August 2010	MF	(England) Marlon Pack	(England) Cheltenham Town	Loan	
31	9 September 2010	GK	(England) Liam O'Brien	(England) Eastbourne Borough	Loan	
5	9 September 2010	MF	(England) Matt Ritchie	(England) Swindon Town	Loan	
31	8 October 2010	FW	(England) Samuel Kehinde	Released	Free	
-	9 December 2010	DF	(England) Perry Ryan	(England) Bognor Regis Town	Loan	
5	7 January 2011	MF	(England) Matt Ritchie	(England) Swindon Town	Undisclosed	
38	18 January 2011	DF	(England) Ellis Martin	(England) Havant & Waterlooville	Loan	
17	29 January 2011	FW	(Nigeria) John Utaka	(France) Montpellier	Undisclosed	
36	24 March 2011	MF	(England) Tom Kilbey	(England) Lincoln City	Loan	
19	5 May 2011	DF	(England) James Bowels	Released	Free	

== Player statistics ==
=== Squad statistics ===
Last updated on 7 May 2011.

No.	Pos	Nat	Player	Total		Championship		FA Cup		League Cup	
No.	Pos	Nat	Player	Apps	Goals	Apps	Goals	Apps	Goals	Apps	Goals
1	GK	(England) ENG	Jamie Ashdown	50	0	46	0	1	0	3	0
2	MF	(England) ENG	Greg Halford	33	5	33	5	0	0	0	0
3	DF	(England) ENG	Carl Dickinson	39	0	23+13	0	1	0	2	0
4	DF	(South Africa) RSA	Aaron Mokoena	40	2	29+8	2	1	0	2	0
5	MF	(England) ENG	Matt Ritchie	8	0	2+3	0	0	0	3	0
5	DF	(Belgium) BEL	Ritchie de Laet	22	0	22	0	0	0	0	0
6	MF	(Republic of Ireland) IRL	Marc Wilson	6	0	4	0	0	0	2	0
6	DF	(Iceland) ISL	Hermann Hreidarsson	29	1	20+8	1	0+1	0	0	0
7	MF	(Republic of Ireland) IRL	Liam Lawrence	33	8	28+3	7	1	0	1	1
8	MF	(England) ENG	Hayden Mullins	49	2	45	2	1	0	3	0
9	FW	(England) ENG	Danny Webber	8	0	1+7	0	0	0	0	0
10	FW	(England) ENG	David Nugent	48	14	44	13	1	0	3	1
11	MF	(England) ENG	Michael Brown	24	3	20+1	2	0	0	2+1	1
14	MF	(England) ENG	Jonathan Hogg	19	0	19	0	0	0	0	0
17	FW	(Nigeria) NGR	John Utaka	28	3	23+2	3	1	0	1+1	0
17	MF	(Wales) WAL	David Cotterill	15	1	12+3	1	0	0	0	0
18	FW	(England) ENG	Dave Kitson	37	8	35	8	1	0	0+1	0
19	DF	(England) ENG	James Bowles	2	0	2	0	0	0	0	0
20	DF	(England) ENG	Joel Ward	46	3	33+9	3	1	0	2+1	0
21	FW	(England) ENG	Tommy Smith	4	0	3	0	0	0	1	0
22	MF	(Scotland) SCO	Richard Hughes	14	0	5+6	0	0	0	3	0
24	FW	(Netherlands) NED	Nadir Çiftçi	22	2	4+15	1	0+1	0	1+1	1
25	DF	(Senegal) SEN	Ibrahima Sonko	27	1	16+7	1	1	0	3	0
27	FW	(Nigeria) NGR	Nwankwo Kanu	34	2	13+19	2	1	0	1	0
33	DF	(Portugal) POR	Ricardo Rocha	29	0	26+3	0	0	0	0	0
36	MF	(England) ENG	Tom Kilbey	3	1	0+2	0	0+1	1	0	0
39	MF	(England) ENG	Peter Gregory	2	0	0+1	0	0	0	0+1	0
40	MF	(England) ENG	Marlon Pack	2	0	0+1	0	0	0	0+1	0

=== Disciplinary records ===
Last updated on 7 May 2011.

No.	Pos.	Nat.	Player	Yellow card	Yellow card Red card	Red card
1	GK	(England)	Jamie Ashdown	2	0	0
2	DF	(England)	Greg Halford	4	0	1
3	DF	(England)	Carl Dickinson	5	0	1
4	DF	(South Africa)	Aaron Mokoena	11	0	0
5	DF	(Belgium)	Ritchie De Laet	5	0	0
6	DF	(Iceland)	Hermann Hreidarsson	7	0	0
20	DF	(England)	Joel Ward	1	0	0
33	DF	(Portugal)	Ricardo Rocha	6	0	2
7	MF	(Republic of Ireland)	Liam Lawrence	3	1	0
8	MF	(England)	Hayden Mullins	5	0	1
11	MF	(England)	Michael Brown	2	0	0
14	MF	(England)	Jonathan Hogg	7	1	0
17	MF	(Wales)	David Cotterill	3	0	0
10	FW	(England)	David Nugent	7	0	0
18	FW	(England)	Dave Kitson	8	0	0
–	MF	(Republic of Ireland)	Marc Wilson	2	0	0
–	FW	(Nigeria)	John Utaka	3	0	0

== Competition ==
=== Championship ===
Pos	Team	Pld	W	D	L	GF	GA	GD	Pts
14	Watford	46	16	13	17	77	71	+6	61
15	Bristol City	46	17	9	20	62	65	−3	60
16	Portsmouth	46	15	13	18	53	60	−7	58
17	Barnsley	46	14	14	18	55	66	−11	56
18	Coventry City	46	14	13	19	54	58	−4	55

Updated to match(es) played on 7 May 2011. Source: The Football League
Rules for classification: 1) points; 2) goal difference; 3) number of goals scored.

==== Results summary ====
Overall								Home						Away					
Pld	W	D	L	GF	GA	GD	Pts	W	D	L	GF	GA	GD	W	D	L	GF	GA	GD
46	15	13	18	53	60	−7	58	8	9	6	31	26	+5	7	4	12	22	34	−12

Last updated: 7 May 2011.
Source: Championship Table

==== Results by round ====
Round	1	2	3	4	5	6	7	8	9	10	11	12	13	14	15	16	17	18	19	20	21	22	23	24	25	26	27	28	29	30	31	32	33	34	35	36	37	38	39	40	41	42	43	44	45	46
Ground	A	H	A	H	H	A	A	H	H	A	H	A	A	H	A	H	H	A	A	H	A	H	H	A	A	H	A	H	A	H	A	H	H	A	H	A	H	A	A	H	H	A	H	A	H	A
Result	L	D	L	L	D	L	L	W	W	D	W	W	W	W	L	D	L	L	W	L	W	W	D	D	L	L	L	D	L	D	W	W	W	W	W	L	D	W	L	D	L	L	D	D	L	D
Position	20	19	22	24	24	24	24	20	21	21	17	15	12	10	13	14	16	16	12	12	14	13	15	18	18	18	18	20	20	18	16	15	13	12	11	13	13	13	13	14	14	14	14	14	16	16

Updated to match(es) played on 7 May 2011. Source: Portsmouthfc.co.uk, statto.com
A = Away; H = Home; W = Win; D = Draw; L = Loss

=== Championship ===
7 August 2010 1	Coventry City	2–0	Portsmouth	Coventry
15:00 BST	Eastwood 4', 70'; Turner (yellow card) 61'	Report	(yellow card) 33' Utaka	Stadium: Ricoh Arena; Attendance: 18,814; Referee: Andy D'Urso

14 August 2010 2	Portsmouth	1–1	Reading	Portsmouth
15:00 BST	Çiftçi 8'	Report	87' Kébé	Stadium: Fratton Park; Attendance: 16,497; Referee: Mick Russell

21 August 2010 3	Preston North End	1–0	Portsmouth	Preston
15:00 BST	Coutts (yellow card) 14'; Hayes 17'; Treacy (yellow card) 30'	Report	(yellow card) 90+1' Mokoena; (yellow card) 90+3' Ward; (yellow card) 90+5' Wilson	Stadium: Deepdale; Attendance: 9,666; Referee: David Webb

28 August 2010 4	Portsmouth	0–2	Cardiff City	Portsmouth
15:00 BST	Mokoena (yellow card) 59'	Report	38' (o.g.) Mullins; 49' Bothroyd	Stadium: Fratton Park; Attendance: 15,866; Referee: Andy Penn

11 September 2010 5	Portsmouth	0–0	Ipswich Town	Portsmouth
15:00 BST	Dickinson (yellow card) 50'	Report		Stadium: Fratton Park; Attendance: 15,445; Referee: Steve Tanner

14 September 2010 6	Crystal Palace	4–1	Portsmouth	Selhurst Park London
19:45 BST	Vaughan 14', 55', 59'; Garvan (yellow card) 45'; Andrew (yellow card) 90'; Danns 81' (pen.)	Report	Kitson 24'	Attendance: 14,219; Referee: Peter Walton/Mick Russell

18 September 2010 7	Sheffield United	1–0	Portsmouth	Sheffield
15:00 BST	Ertl (yellow card) 33'; Ward (yellow card) 60'; Evans 77'	Report	(yellow card) 31' Brown; (yellow card) 57' Dickinson	Stadium: Bramall Lane; Attendance: 20,712; Referee: Grant Hegley

24 September 2010 8	Portsmouth	6–1	Leicester City	Portsmouth
19:45 BST	Lawrence 10' (pen.), 33'; Rocha (yellow card) 29'; Mokoena (yellow card) 53'; Nugent 58'; Kitson 59', 83'; Utaka (yellow card) 68'; Brown 90+1'	Report	(yellow card) 9' Morrison; (yellow card) 24' Oakley; (red card) 31' Vítor; 71' Howard; (yellow card) 81' Berner; (yellow card) 89' Neilson	Stadium: Fratton Park; Attendance: 13,751; Referee: Keith Hill

28 September 2010 9	Portsmouth	3–1	Bristol City	Portsmouth
19:45 BST	Mokoena (yellow card) 25'; Utaka 51'; Mokoena 58'; Mullins 90+4'	Report	53' Stead; (yellow card) 73' Rose	Stadium: Fratton Park; Attendance: 14.417; Referee: Graham Horwood

2 October 2010 10	Middlesbrough	2–2	Portsmouth	Middlesbrough
15:00 BST	Bates 29'; Robson 43' (pen.); Bates (yellow card) 55'; Bailey (yellow card) 73'; Robson (red card) 85'; McMahon (yellow card) 87'	Report	(yellow card) 43' Kitson; 60' Nugent; 88' (pen.) Lawrence	Stadium: Riverside Stadium; Attendance: 13,749; Referee: Rob Shoebridge

16 October 2010 11	Portsmouth	3–2	Watford	Portsmouth
15:00 BST	Mullins 29'; Mokoena (yellow card) 33'; Nugent (yellow card) 56'; Kitson 72'; Brown 80'; Kitson (yellow card) 89'	Report	(yellow card) 43' Eustace; 67' M. Taylor; 70' McGinn	Stadium: Fratton Park; Attendance: 16,606; Referee: Danny McDermid

19 October 2010 12	Millwall	0–1	Portsmouth	London
19:45 BST	Mkandawire (yellow card) 31'; Hackett (yellow card) 73'; Carter (yellow card) 90'	Report	(yellow card) 4' Dickinson; 77' (pen.) Lawrence; (yellow card) 84' Kitson	Stadium: The Den; Attendance: Andy Woolmer; Referee: 12,095

23 October 2010 13	Hull City	1–2	Portsmouth	Kingston upon Hull
15:00 BST	Barmby (yellow card) 37'; Gerrard (yellow card) 37'; Barmby 62'; Cairney (yellow card) 63'; Ayala (yellow card) 72'	Report	(yellow card) 37' Halford; 45+1' Nugent; 47' Halford	Stadium: KC Stadium; Attendance: 20,378; Referee: Darren Deadman

30 October 2010 14	Portsmouth	2–1	Nottingham Forest	Portsmouth
15:00 BST	Sonko 18'; Lawrence 62'	Report	27' Anderson; (yellow card) 38' Majewski	Stadium: Fratton Park; Attendance: 19,719; Referee: Mark Haywood

6 November 2010 15	Derby County	2–0	Portsmouth	Derby
17:20 GMT	Savage 22'; Leacock (yellow card) 45'; Green 57'	Report	(yellow card) 6' Mokoena; (yellow card) 88' Mullins	Stadium: Pride Park Stadium; Attendance: 29,086; Referee: Colin Webster

9 November 2010 16	Portsmouth	1–1	Queens Park Rangers	Portsmouth
19:45 GMT	Lawrence 71' (pen.) (yellow card) 90' (yellow-red card); Ashdown (yellow card) 84'	Report	Connolly (red card) 67'; Smith 90+1' (pen.)	Stadium: Fratton Park; Attendance: 17,818; Referee: Gavin Ward

13 November 2010 17	Portsmouth	2–3	Doncaster Rovers	Portsmouth
15:00 GMT	Nugent (yellow card) 22' (goal) 73'; Ward 65'; Halford (yellow card) 85'; Dickinson (red card) 87'; Mullins (yellow card) 89'	Report	14' (yellow card) 90+2' Hayter; (yellow card) 24' (goal) 79' Healy; 25' Coppinger	Stadium: Fratton Park; Attendance: 14,828; Referee: Graham Scott

20 November 2010 18	Barnsley	1–0	Portsmouth	Barnsley
15:00 GMT	Hammill 13'; Doyle (yellow card) 21'; Lovre (yellow card) 25'; Hassell (yellow card) 76'	Report		Stadium: Oakwell; Attendance: 10,908; Referee: David Foster

26 November 2010 19	Swansea City	1–2	Portsmouth	Swansea
19:45 GMT	Beattie 2'	Report	(yellow card) 19' (goal) 65' Halford; 43' (yellow card) 45' Nugent; (yellow card) 50' Barnett; (yellow card) 56' Lawrence	Stadium: Liberty Stadium; Attendance: 17,584; Referee: Steve Tanner

11 December 2010 21	Norwich City	0–2	Portsmouth	Norwich
15:00 GMT	Barnett (yellow card) 59' (yellow-red card) 90+6'	Report	(yellow card) 16' Mullins; 73' Kitson; 90+4' (pen.) (yellow card) 59' Halford	Stadium: Carrow Road; Attendance: 25,215; Referee: Simon Hooper

26 December 2010 23	Portsmouth	1–1	Millwall	Portsmouth
13:00 GMT	Nugent 73'; Mokoena (yellow card) 2'; Hreiðarsson (yellow card) 54'; Rocha (yellow card) 65'	Report	Trotter 26' (yellow card) 43'; Dunne (yellow card) 71'; Barron (yellow card) 80'	Stadium: Fratton Park; Attendance: 17,521; Referee: David Phillips

28 December 2010 24	Leeds United	3–3	Portsmouth	Leeds
15:00 GMT	Gradel 7'; Howson 10'; Johnson 62'; McCartney (yellow card) 83'; Schmeichel (yellow card) 90'	[ Report]	Nugent 33'; O'Brien 63', 90' (o.g.); Mokoena (yellow card) 65'; Kitson (yellow card) 90'	Stadium: Elland Road; Attendance: 31,556; Referee: David Webb

1 January 2011 25	Watford	3–0	Portsmouth	Watford
15:00 GMT	A. Taylor 42'; Sordell 52'; Graham 69'	[ Report]	Dickinson (yellow card) 57'; Utaka (yellow card) 74'; Halford (red card) 90'	Stadium: Vicarage Road; Attendance: 12,577; Referee: Andy D'Urso

3 January 2011 26	Portsmouth	2–3	Hull City	Portsmouth
15:00 GMT	Lawrence 56' (pen.); Halford 76'	[ Report]	Bullard 21' (pen.); Fryatt 69'; Barmby 72'; Solano (yellow card) 39'; Gerrard (yellow card) 57'	Stadium: Fratton Park; Attendance: 14,604; Referee: Rob Shoebridge

15 January 2011 27	Nottingham Forest	2–1	Portsmouth	West Bridgford
15:00 GMT	Sonko 87' (o.g.); Tudgay 90'	[ Report]	Kanu 26'	Stadium: City Ground; Attendance: 21,856; Referee: Kevin Friend

22 January 2011 28	Portsmouth	2–2	Leeds United	Portsmouth
15:00 GMT	Ward 26'; Utaka 61'; Rocha (yellow card) 85'	Report	Connolly (yellow card) 18'; Becchio 47'; Somma 63'	Stadium: Fratton Park; Attendance: 20,040; Referee: Anthony Taylor

25 January 2011 20	Portsmouth	1–2	Burnley	Portsmouth
19:45	Utaka 33'	Report	Rodriguez 31'; Marney 37'; Cork (yellow card) 39'; Duff (yellow card) 88'	Stadium: Fratton Park; Attendance: 13,345; Referee: Stuart Attwell

1 February 2011 29	Queens Park Rangers	2–0	Portsmouth	London
20:00 GMT	Taarabt 59'; Hill 73'	Report		Stadium: Loftus Road; Attendance: 14,078; Referee: Grant Hegley

5 February 2011 30	Portsmouth	1–1	Derby County	Portsmouth
15:00 GMT	Nugent 90'	Report	S. Davies 34'	Stadium: Fratton Park; Attendance: 14,555; Referee: Neil Swarbrick

12 February 2011 31	Doncaster Rovers	0–2	Portsmouth	Doncaster
15:00 GMT	Webster (yellow card) 81'; Keegan (yellow card) 86'	Report	Kitson 41'; Ward 52'; Hreiðarsson (yellow card) 71'; Hogg (red card) 63'	Stadium: Keepmoat Stadium; Attendance: 10,288; Referee: Andy Haines

19 February 2011 32	Portsmouth	1–0	Barnsley	Portsmouth
15:00 GMT	Hreiðarsson (yellow card) 67'; De Laet (yellow card) 77'; Kitson (yellow card) 78'; Kanu 84'	Report	McShane (yellow card) 59'; Haynes (yellow card) 62'; Mellis (yellow card) 83'	Stadium: Fratton Park; Attendance: 14,318; Referee: Roger East

22 February 2011 33	Portsmouth	1–0	Crystal Palace	Portsmouth
19:45 GMT	Nugent 65'; Hogg (yellow card) 83'; Kitson (yellow card) 90'	Report	Wright (yellow card) 30'; Moxey (yellow card) 53'; McCarthy (yellow card) 60'; Clyne (yellow card) 81'	Stadium: Fratton Park; Attendance: 15,641; Referee: Brendan Malone

26 February 2011 34	Ipswich Town	0–2	Portsmouth	Ipswich
15:00 GMT		Report	Rocha (yellow card) 20'; Nugent 55'; Cotterill 77'	Stadium: Portman Road; Attendance: 23,345; Referee: Scott Mathieson

1 March 2011 22	Portsmouth	2–0	Scunthorpe United	Portsmouth
15:00 GMT	Kitson 62'; Mokoena 80'	Report		Stadium: Fratton Park; Attendance: 14,252; Referee: Graham Salisbury

5 March 2011 35	Portsmouth	1–0	Sheffield United	Portsmouth
15:00 GMT	Hreiðarsson 24'	Report		Stadium: Fratton Park; Attendance: 15,096; Referee: Russell Booth

8 March 2011 36	Bristol City	2–1	Portsmouth	Bristol
19:45 GMT	Adomah 40'; Stewart (yellow card) 63'; Halford 66' (o.g.)	Report	Cotterill (yellow card) 72'; Rocha (yellow card) 83'; Kitson 90'	Stadium: Ashton Gate Stadium; Attendance: 13,886; Referee: Jon Moss

12 March 2011 37	Portsmouth	0–0	Middlesbrough	Portsmouth
15:00 GMT	Hogg (yellow card) 51'; Kitson (yellow card) 55'	Report	McMahon (yellow card) 78'	Stadium: Fratton Park; Attendance: 16,447; Referee: Paul Crossley

19 March 2011 38	Leicester City	0–1	Portsmouth	Leicester
15:00 GMT		Report	Nugent 12' (yellow card) 37'; Hogg (yellow card) 39'; Dickinson (yellow card) 82'	Stadium: Walkers Stadium; Referee: Paul Tierney

2 April 2011 39	Reading	2–0	Portsmouth	Reading
15:00 BST	Long 30', 37' (pen.); McAnuff (yellow card) 40'	Report	De Laet (yellow card) 8'; Mullins (yellow card) 27'; R. Rocha (red card) 36'; Mokoena (yellow card) 70'; Hogg (yellow card) 90'	Stadium: Madejski Stadium; Attendance: 21,896; Referee: Kevin Friend

9 April 2011 40	Portsmouth	1–1	Preston North End	Portsmouth
15:00 BST	De Laet (yellow card) 49'; Halford 62'	Report	Hume 32'; Nicholson (yellow card) 54'; Carter (yellow card) 64'	Stadium: Fratton Park; Attendance: 14,349; Referee: Danny McDermid

12 April 2011 41	Portsmouth	0–3	Coventry City	Portsmouth
19:45 BST	R. Rocha (yellow card) 52'; Nugent (yellow card) 60'; Mullins (red card) 69'; Cotterill (yellow card) 84'; De Laet (yellow card) 90'	Report	King 19' (pen.), 70' (pen.); McSheffrey 58'; Bell (yellow card) 90'	Stadium: Fratton Park; Attendance: 13,132; Referee: Dean Whitestone

16 April 2011 42	Cardiff City	3–0	Portsmouth	Cardiff
15:00 BST	Olofinjana 6'; Bothroyd 45'; Samuel (yellow card) 61'; Whittingham 73'	Report	Lawrence (yellow card) 16'; R. Rocha (red card) 18'; Nugent (yellow card) 60'; Kitson (yellow card) 88'	Stadium: Cardiff City Stadium; Attendance: 24,007; Referee: Kevin Wright

23 April 2011 43	Portsmouth	0–0	Swansea City	Portsmouth
15:00 BST	Kitson (yellow card) 23'; Nugent (yellow card) 30'; Hreiðarsson (yellow card) 36'; Hogg (yellow card) 86'	Report	Borini (yellow card) 66'; Monk (yellow card) 83'; Britton (yellow card) 90'	Stadium: Fratton Park; Attendance: 15,907; Referee: Darren Deadman

25 April 2011 44	Burnley	1–1	Portsmouth	Burnley
15:00 BST	Eagles 74'	Report	Ashdown (yellow card) 56'; Nugent 57'; Hreiðarsson (yellow card) 65'; Cotterill (yellow card) 90'	Stadium: Turf Moor; Attendance: 14,927; Referee: Carl Boyeson

2 May 2011 45	Portsmouth	0–1	Norwich City	Portsmouth
15:00 BST	Mokoena (yellow card) 9'; Hreiðarsson (yellow card) 31'	Report	Jackson 50'	Stadium: Fratton Park; Attendance: 17,113; Referee: Andy D'Urso

8 May 2011 46	Scunthorpe United	1–1	Portsmouth	Scunthorpe
15:00 BST	Nuñez 27'; O'Connor (yellow card) 73'	Report	Hreiðarsson (yellow card) 28'; Mokoena (yellow card) 67'; Nugent 81'	Stadium: Glanford Park; Attendance: 5,142; Referee: Martin Atkinson

=== League Cup ===
9 August 2010 1	Stevenage	1–2	Portsmouth	Stevenage
19:45 BST	Murphy 18'	Report	8' Çiftçi; 36' Brown	Stadium: Broadhall Way; Attendance: 4,236; Referee: Dean Whitestone

24 August 2010 2	Portsmouth	1–1 (a.e.t.) (4–3 p)	Crystal Palace	Portsmouth
19:45 BST	Wilson (yellow card) 27'; Nugent 57'; Brown (yellow card) 73'; Çiftçi (yellow card) 104'	Report	(yellow card) 23' Garvan; (yellow card) 73' Obika; 81' (o.g.) Sonko; (red card) 86' Zaha	Stadium: Fratton Park; Attendance: 8,412; Referee: Dave Phillips
	Penalties
	Brown (penalty scored); Wilson (penalty scored); Smith (penalty missed); Pack (penalty scored); Çiftçi (penalty missed); Dickinson (penalty missed); Hughes (penalty scored)		(penalty missed) Djilali; (penalty scored) Cadogan; (penalty missed) Obika; (penalty scored) McCarthy; (penalty scored) Garvan; (penalty missed) Clyne; (penalty missed) Barrett

21 September 2010 3	Portsmouth	1–2	Leicester City	Portsmouth
19:45 BST	Hughes (red card) 66'; Liam Lawrence 82'; Kitson (yellow card) 83'	Report	3' (yellow card) 53' Morrison; 43' Dyer	Stadium: Fratton Park; Attendance: 8,327; Referee: Fred Graham

=== FA Cup ===
8 January 2011 3	Brighton & Hove Albion	3–1	Portsmouth	Brighton
15:00 GMT	Wood 26'; Barnes 45' (pen.); Sandaza 90+1'	Report	Kitson (red card) 14'; Kilbey 88'	Stadium: Withdean Stadium; Attendance: 7,792; Referee: Scott
