= Harvey White (footballer) =

English footballer

- White in 2026

Personal information
- Full name: Harvey David White
- Date of birth: 19 September 2001 (age 25)
- Place of birth: Maidstone, England
- Height: 1.71 m (5 ft 7 in)
- Position: Midfielder

Team information
- Current team: Plymouth Argyle
- Number: 7

Youth career
- –2023: Tottenham Hotspur

Senior career*
Years	Team	Apps	(Gls)
2020–2023	Tottenham Hotspur	1	(0)
2021	→ Portsmouth (loan)	21	(1)
2023	→ Derby County (loan)	15	(0)
2023–2026	Stevenage	71	(5)
2026–	Plymouth Argyle	13	(1)

International career
2019–2020	England U18	2	(0)
2020–2021	England U20	1	(0)
- * Club domestic league appearances and goals as of 24 October 2026 (UTC)

Harvey David White (born 19 September 2001) is an English professional footballer who plays as a midfielder for EFL League One club Plymouth Argyle.

== Early life ==
Harvey White was born in Maidstone, Kent and attended The Holmesdale School, joining the Tottenham Hotspur Academy as a youngster.

== Club career ==
=== Tottenham Hotspur ===
White made his senior debut for Tottenham in a 4–0 UEFA Europa League victory against Ludogorets Razgrad on 26 November 2020, coming on as an 82nd-minute substitute. He made his first start for Tottenham on 10 January 2021 in the third round match of the FA Cup against eighth-tier Marine that finished in a 5–0 win. White joined League One club Portsmouth on 18 January 2021, on a loan agreement until the end of the 2020–21 season. His first goal in senior first-team football came in a 1–0 away victory against Oxford United on 23 February 2021.

White returned to the Tottenham under-21 team upon the expiry of his loan and was called up to the first team by head coach Antonio Conte during the 2022 FIFA World Cup break. He played in friendly matches against OGC Nice and Motherwell and was praised by Conte as "really, really intelligent" after the Nice game. White made his Premier League debut for Tottenham against Crystal Palace on 4 January 2023, coming on as an 86th-minute substitute in a 4–0 win. He joined League One club Derby County on loan on 31 January 2023, until the end of the 2022–23 season, making 15 appearances during the loan spell, five of which were starting.

=== Stevenage ===
White signed for League One club Stevenage in September 2023 for an undisclosed fee. He scored his first goal for the club on 14 November 2023 against Crystal Palace U21 in the EFL Trophy and made 18 appearances that season. He went on to establish himself as a key member of Stevenage's midfield, making 41 League One appearances in the 2024–25 season.

== International career ==
In May 2019, White earned his first cap for the England under-18 team in a penalty shootout defeat following a 1–1 draw in extra time against Spain.

== Career statistics ==
As of match played 24 October 2026

Appearances and goals by club, season and competition
Club	Season	League			FA Cup		League Cup		Other		Total	
Club	Season	Division	Apps	Goals	Apps	Goals	Apps	Goals	Apps	Goals	Apps	Goals
Tottenham Hotspur U21	2018–19	—			—		—		1 (Note: Appearance(s) in EFL Trophy)	1	1	1
Tottenham Hotspur U21	2019–20	—			—		—		3	0	3	0
Tottenham Hotspur U21	Total		0	0	0	0	0	0	4	1	4	1
Tottenham Hotspur	2020–21	Premier League	0	0	1	0	0	0	1 (Note: Appearance(s) in UEFA Europa League)	0	2	0
Tottenham Hotspur	2022–23	Premier League	1	0	0	0	0	0	0	0	1	0
Tottenham Hotspur	Total		1	0	1	0	0	0	1	0	3	0
Portsmouth (loan)	2020–21	League One	21	1	0	0	0	0	1	0	22	1
Derby County (loan)	2022–23	League One	15	0	—		—		—		15	0
Stevenage	2023–24	League One	11	0	4	1	0	0	3	1	18	2
Stevenage	2024–25	League One	41	2	2	0	1	0	6	1	50	3
Stevenage	2025–26	League One	46	4	1	0	1	0	2	2	50	6
Stevenage	Total		98	6	7	1	2	0	11	4	118	11
Plymouth Argyle	2026–27	League One	13	0	0	0	2	0	1	0	16	0
Career total			148	7	8	1	4	0	18	5	178	13

== Honours ==
Portsmouth

- EFL Trophy runner-up: 2019–20
