= 2020–21 Portsmouth F.C. season =

Portsmouth
2020–21 season
- Chairman: Michael Eisner
- Head Coach: Kenny Jackett (until 14 March); Danny Cowley (from 19 March)
- Stadium: Fratton Park
- EFL League One: 8th (72 points)
- FA Cup: Third Round
- EFL Cup: Second Round
- EFL Trophy: Third Round
- Top goalscorer: League: John Marquis (16); All: John Marquis (18)
- Biggest win: 6–1 vs. King's Lynn Town (H) (28 November 2020)
- Biggest defeat: 5–1 vs. Peterborough (A) (12 January 2021)
Home colours	Away colours	Third colours

The 2020–21 season was Portsmouth's fourth consecutive season in EFL League One, Along with League One, the club also participated in the FA Cup, EFL Cup and EFL Trophy.

Due to the COVID-19 pandemic in the United Kingdom, all games for the season were played behind closed doors without supporters present, except for two matches in December 2020 that were limited to a maximum capacity of 2,000 supporters.

The season covers the period from 1 July 2020 to 30 June 2021.

== Players ==
=== Squad ===
As of 11 May 2021

Note: Flags indicate national team as defined under FIFA eligibility rules; some limited exceptions apply. Players may hold more than one non-FIFA nationality.

No.	Pos.	Nation	Player
1	GK	SCO	Craig MacGillivray
2	DF	ENG	Callum Johnson
3	DF	ENG	Lee Brown
4	MF	ENG	Tom Naylor (captain)
5	DF	ENG	Paul Downing
6	DF	ENG	Jack Whatmough
7	FW	IND	Ryan Williams
8	MF	ENG	Ben Close
9	FW	ENG	John Marquis
10	FW	WAL	Ellis Harrison
11	FW	IRL	Ronan Curtis
13	DF	ENG	James Bolton
14	MF	ENG	Andy Cannon
15	DF	DEN	Rasmus Nicolaisen (on loan from FC Midtjylland)
16	MF	SCO	George Byers (on loan from Swansea City)
19	FW	IRL	Marcus Harness
20	DF	ENG	Sean Raggett

No.	Pos.	Nation	Player
21	DF	ENG	Charlie Daniels
22	GK	ENG	Lewis Ward (on loan from Exeter City)
23	MF	ENG	Harvey White (on loan from Tottenham Hotspur)
24	FW	ENG	Michael Jacobs
26	FW	ENG	Jordy Hiwula
27	DF	ENG	David Setters
28	FW	MLT	Alfie Bridgman
29	DF	ENG	Harvey Hughes
30	MF	WAL	Harry Jewitt-White
31	FW	KOR	Lee Suk-jae
32	MF	ENG	Charlie Bell
33	MF	ENG	Harrison Brook
35	GK	ENG	Alex Bass
37	DF	TAN	Haji Mnoga
38	DF	ENG	Harry Kavanagh
40	FW	ENG	Alfie Stanley
42	GK	ENG	Taylor Seymour

== Transfers ==
=== In ===
No.	Pos.	Player	Transferred From	Fee	Date	Source
20	DF	(England) Sean Raggett	(England) Norwich City	Free Transfer	3 August 2020	
2	DF	(England) Callum Johnson	(England) Accrington Stanley	Undisclosed	7 September 2020	
24	FW	(England) Michael Jacobs	(England) Wigan Athletic	Free Transfer	14 September 2020	
42	GK	(England) Taylor Seymour	(England) Lancing FC	Undisclosed	15 September 2020	
26	FW	(England) Jordy Hiwula	Free agent	—N/a	22 October 2020	
21	DF	(England) Charlie Daniels	(England) Shrewsbury Town	Free Transfer	23 January 2021	

=== Out ===
No.	Pos.	Player	Transferred to	Fee	Date	Source
21	GK	(England) Luke McGee	(England) Forest Green Rovers	End of Contract	30 June 2020	
40	FW	(England) Bradley Lethbridge	(England) Bognor Regis Town	End of Contract	30 June 2020	
6	DF	(England) Christian Burgess	(Belgium) Union Saint-Gilloise	End of Contract	7 July 2020	
31	DF	(England) Matthew Casey	(England) Bognor Regis Town	End of Contract	9 July 2020	
38	DF	(England) Brandon Haunstrup	(Scotland) Kilmarnock	End of Contract	9 July 2020	
9	FW	(England) Oliver Hawkins	(England) Ipswich Town	End of Contract	9 July 2020	
30	MF	(England) Adam May	(England) Cambridge United	End of Contract	9 July 2020	
8	FW	(Jersey) Brett Pitman	(England) Swindon Town	End of Contract	9 July 2020	
26	MF	(England) Gareth Evans	(England) Bradford City	Free Transfer	25 September 2020	

=== Loaned in ===
No.	Pos.	Player	Loaned From	Until	Date	Source
23	DF	(England) Cameron Pring	(England) Bristol City	3 January 2021 (Note: On 3 January, Pring was recalled early by his parent club Bristol City.)	1 September 2020	
15	DF	(Denmark) Rasmus Nicolaisen	(Denmark) FC Midtjylland	End of Season	23 September 2020	
23	MF	(England) Harvey White	(England) Tottenham Hotspur	End of Season	18 January 2021	
16	MF	(Scotland) George Byers	(Wales) Swansea City	End of Season	23 January 2021	
22	GK	(England) Lewis Ward	(England) Exeter City	End of Season	28 January 2021	

=== Loaned out ===
No.	Pos.	Player	Loaned to	Until	Date	Source
34	MF	(Northern Ireland) Gerard Storey	(England) Gosport Borough	1 November 2020	16 September 2020	
36	FW	(Northern Ireland) Eoin Teggart	(England) Gosport Borough	1 November 2020	16 September 2020	
40	FW	(England) Alfie Stanley	(England) Bognor Regis Town	1 November 2020	17 September 2020	
18	FW	(Saint Lucia) Reeco Hackett	(England) Bromley	3 January 2021	21 September 2020	
18	FW	(Saint Lucia) Reeco Hackett	(England) Southend United	End of Season	7 January 2021	
36	FW	(Northern Ireland) Eoin Teggart	(Northern Ireland) Cliftonville	End of Season	7 January 2021	
17	MF	(England) Bryn Morris	(England) Northampton Town	End of Season	18 January 2021	
35	GK	(England) Alex Bass	(England) Southend United	6 March 2021	27 February 2021	
41	GK	(United States) Duncan Turnbull	(United States) Las Vegas Lights	End of Season	5 April 2021	

== Competitions ==
=== Overall record ===
Competition	Starting round	Final position	Record							
Competition	Starting round	Final position	Pld	W	D	L	GF	GA	GD	Win %
EFL League One	Matchday 1	8th	46	21	9	16	65	51	+14	45.65
FA Cup	First round	Third round	3	2	0	1	10	5	+5	66.67
EFL Cup	First round	Second Round	2	0	1	1	3	7	−4	0.00
EFL Trophy	Group stage	Third round	5	3	0	2	9	6	+3	60.00
Total			56	26	10	20	87	69	+18	46.43

Last updated: 9 July 2026
Source: Soccerway

=== EFL League One ===
==== League table ====
Pos	Team	Pld	W	D	L	GF	GA	GD	Pts	Promotion, qualification or relegation
4	Sunderland	46	20	17	9	70	42	+28	77	Qualification for League One play-offs
5	Lincoln City	46	22	11	13	69	50	+19	77	Qualification for League One play-offs
6	Oxford United	46	22	8	16	77	56	+21	74	Qualification for League One play-offs
7	Charlton Athletic	46	20	14	12	70	56	+14	74	
8	Portsmouth	46	21	9	16	65	51	+14	72	
9	Ipswich Town	46	19	12	15	46	46	0	69	
10	Gillingham	46	19	10	17	63	60	+3	67	
11	Accrington Stanley	46	18	13	15	63	68	−5	67	
12	Crewe Alexandra	46	18	12	16	56	61	−5	66	

Source: EFL Official Website
Rules for classification: 1) Points; 2) Goal difference; 3) Number of goals scored; 4) Head-to-head results; 5) Wins; 6) Away goals; 7) Penalty points (sec 9.5); 8) 12-point sending off offences

==== Results summary ====
Overall								Home						Away					
Pld	W	D	L	GF	GA	GD	Pts	W	D	L	GF	GA	GD	W	D	L	GF	GA	GD
46	21	9	16	65	51	+14	72	9	5	9	29	24	+5	12	4	7	36	27	+9

Last updated: 9 May 2021.
Source: BBC

==== Results by matchday ====
Matchday	1	2	3	4	5	6	7	8	9	10	11	12	13	14	15	16	17	18	19	20	21	22	23	24	25	26	27	28	29	30	31	32	33	34	35	36	37	38	39	40	41	42	43	44	45	46
Ground	H	A	H	A	H	H	A	A	H	H	A	A	H	H	A	H	A	H	A	A	H	H	H	A	H	H	A	H	A	H	A	A	H	A	H	A	H	A	H	A	A	A	H	A	A	H
Result	D	D	L	W	W	L	W	W	W	L	W	D	W	D	L	W	W	D	W	W	W	L	L	W	D	W	L	L	W	D	L	L	L	L	W	W	W	W	L	D	L	L	W	D	W	L
Position	15	17	21	11	9	10	8	5	5	7	7	6	4	4	6	4	3	2	1	3	3	4	5	4	5	4	5	5	4	4	5	6	6	10	6	5	5	4	5	6	7	8	7	6	6	8

Updated to match(es) played on 9 May 2021. Source: 11v11 for league tables and fixtures
A = Away; H = Home; W = Win; D = Draw; L = Loss

==== Matches ====
Win Draw Loss Postponed

The 2020/21 season fixtures were released on 21 August.

12 September 2020 1	Portsmouth	0–0	Shrewsbury Town	Portsmouth
15:00 BST		Report		Stadium: Fratton Park; Referee: Charles Breakspear

20 September 2020 2	Rochdale	0–0	Portsmouth	Rochdale
15:00 BST	McShane (yellow card) 86'	Report	Brown (yellow card) 43'; Naylor (yellow card) 51'	Stadium: Spotland; Attendance: 0 Referee: Michael Salisbury

26 September 2020 3	Portsmouth	1–2	Wigan Athletic	Portsmouth
15:00 BST	Harrison 89'	Report	Garner (yellow card) 26'; Evans 39'; Cameron (yellow card) 48'; James 59'	Stadium: Fratton Park; Attendance: 0 Referee: Antony Coggins

3 October 2020 4	Burton Albion	2–4	Portsmouth	Burton-upon-Trent
15:00 BST	Akins 14'; Naylor 20' (o.g.); Hemmings (yellow card) 77'	Report	Harness 2', 47', 74'; Harrison (yellow card) 25'; Whatmough 60'	Stadium: Pirelli Stadium; Attendance: 0 Referee: Tom Nield

10 October 2020 5	Portsmouth	2–1	Milton Keynes Dons	Portsmouth
15:00 BST	Naylor 2' (yellow card) 88'; Harrison 23' (pen.)	Report	Fraser 12' (pen.); Lewington (yellow card) 68'; Jerome (yellow card) 77'	Stadium: Fratton Park; Attendance: 0 Referee: Lee Swabey

17 October 2020 6	Portsmouth	0–1	Doncaster Rovers	Portsmouth
15:00 BST	Harness (yellow card) 38'	Report	James (yellow card) 11' (goal) 79'; Wright (yellow card) 45+2'; Gomes (yellow card) 90+1'	Stadium: Fratton Park; Referee: Brett Huxtable

20 October 2020 7	Gillingham	0–2	Portsmouth	Gillingham
18:30 BST	Maghoma (yellow card) 90+1'	Report	Marquis 15' (yellow card) 90+1'; Jacobs 17'; Johnson (yellow card) 29'	Stadium: Priestfield Stadium; Attendance: 0 Referee: David Rock

24 October 2020 8	Sunderland	1–3	Portsmouth	Sunderland
15:00 BST	Wyke 10'; O'Nien (yellow card) 70' (yellow-red card) 84'	Report	Harness 7'; Williams (yellow card) 19'; Marquis 25', 85' (pen.); Johnson (yellow card) 80'	Stadium: Stadium of Light; Attendance: 0 Referee: Robert Lewis

27 October 2020 9	Portsmouth	4–0	Northampton Town	Portsmouth
19:45 GMT	Marquis 39', 47'; Curtis 50'; Williams (yellow card) 57'; Harness (yellow card) 60' (goal) 83'	Report	Bolger (yellow card) 43'	Stadium: Fratton Park; Attendance: 0 Referee: Trevor Kettle

31 October 2020 10	Portsmouth	0–2	Charlton Athletic	Portsmouth
15:00 GMT	Nicolaisen (yellow card) 90'	Report	Williams 26'; Amos (yellow card) 59'; Maatsen (yellow card) 71'; Aneke 82' (yellow card) 90+3'	Stadium: Fratton Park; Attendance: 0 Referee: Carl Boyeson

3 November 2020 11	Lincoln City	1–3	Portsmouth	Lincoln
19:00 GMT	Hopper 73'; Grant (yellow card) 90+4'	Report	Marquis 5', 50' (yellow card) 88'; Curtis (yellow card) 57' (goal) 61'	Stadium: LNER Stadium; Attendance: 0 Referee: Carl Brook

16 November 2020 12	Plymouth Argyle	2–2	Portsmouth	Plymouth
19:45 GMT	Raggett 11' (o.g.); Opoku (yellow card) 71' (goal) 78'; Reeves (yellow card) 86'	Report	Marquis (yellow card) 33' (goal) 63' (pen.); Naylor 65' (yellow card) 86'; Cannon (yellow card) 73'	Stadium: Home Park; Attendance: 0 Referee: Charles Breakspear

21 November 2020 13	Portsmouth	4–1	Crewe Alexandra	Portsmouth
15:00 GMT	Cannon (yellow card) 15'; Curtis 15', 40'; Naylor 51'; Marquis 56'; Harrison (yellow card) 85'	Report	Ng (yellow card) 57'; Finney 90+4' (pen.)	Stadium: Fratton Park; Attendance: 0 Referee: James Oldham

24 November 2020 14	Portsmouth	1–1	Oxford United	Portsmouth
19:00 GMT	Raggett 19' (yellow card) 90+1'; Cannon (yellow card) 73'	Report	Clare (yellow card) 52'; Rodríguez 69' (pen.); Taylor (yellow card) 90+2'	Stadium: Fratton Park; Attendance: 0 Referee: Tim Robinson

1 December 2020 15	Blackpool	1–0	Portsmouth	Blackpool
19:00 GMT	Ballard (yellow card) 64'; Anderson 64'; Madine (yellow card) 90+2'; Kaikai (yellow card) 90+6'	Report	Marquis (yellow card) 79'; Brown (yellow card) 81'	Stadium: Bloomfield Road; Attendance: 0 Referee: Josh Smith

5 December 2020 16	Portsmouth	2–0	Peterborough United	Portsmouth
15:00 GMT	Cannon (yellow card) 57'; Whatmough 61'; Naylor (yellow card) 68' (goal) 75'; Brown (yellow card) 88'	Report	Thompson (yellow card) 50'; Blake-Tracy (yellow card) 61'; Taylor (yellow card) 85'	Stadium: Fratton Park; Attendance: 2,000; Referee: Peter Wright

12 December 2020 17	Ipswich Town	0–2	Portsmouth	Ipswich
15:00 GMT	Lankester (yellow card) 70'; McGuinness (yellow card) 72'; McGavin (yellow card) 74'	Report	Williams 29' 44'; Curtis (yellow card) 70'; Raggett (yellow card) 79'; Whatmough (yellow card) 88'	Stadium: Portman Road; Attendance: 2,000; Referee: Thomas Bramall

15 December 2020 18	Portsmouth	0–0	Fleetwood Town	Portsmouth
19:45 GMT	Curtis (yellow card) 12'; Whatmough (yellow card) 31'; Williams (yellow card) 34'; Harness (yellow card) 41'	Report	Madden (yellow card) 31'; Andrew (yellow card) 41'; Burns (yellow card) 45+1'; Duffy (yellow card) 90+4'	Stadium: Fratton Park; Attendance: 2,000; Referee: Alan Young

18 December 2020 19	Hull City	0–2	Portsmouth	Kingston upon Hull
17:30 GMT		Report	Greaves 6' (o.g.); Magennis 55' (o.g.)	Stadium: KCOM Stadium; Attendance: 0 Referee: Michael Salisbury

16 January 2021 20	Fleetwood Town	0–1	Portsmouth	Fleetwood
15:00 GMT		Report	Marquis 16'; Whatmough (yellow card) 36'	Stadium: Highbury Stadium; Attendance: 0 Referee: James Bell

19 January 2021 21	Portsmouth	4–0	AFC Wimbledon	Portsmouth
19:00 GMT	Marquis 28'; Williams 36'; Raggett 44'; Close 89'	Report		Stadium: Fratton Park; Attendance: 0 Referee: Trevor Kettle

23 January 2021 22	Portsmouth	0–4	Hull City	Portsmouth
15:00 GMT	Naylor (yellow card) 87'	Report	Whatmough 23', 63' (o.g.); Honeyman 61'; Lewis-Potter (yellow card) 68'; Smallwood (yellow card) 83'; Magennis 90+1'	Stadium: Fratton Park; Attendance: 0 Referee: Ben Toner

26 January 2021 23	Portsmouth	0–1	Lincoln City	Portsmouth
19:00 GMT	Harness (yellow card) 16'; Raggett (yellow card) 22'; Whatmough (red card) 29'	Report	Edun (yellow card) 32'; Rogers 79'; Jackson (yellow card) 88'; McGrandles (yellow card) 90+1'	Stadium: Fratton Park; Attendance: 0 Referee: Sam Purkiss

2 February 2021 24	Charlton Athletic	1–3	Portsmouth	Charlton
19:00 GMT	Oshilaja (yellow card) 18'; Pratley (yellow card) 33'; Stockley 52'; Maatsen (yellow card) 54'; Watson (yellow card) 81'	Report	Harrison (yellow card) 2'; Jacobs 39'; Naylor 55', (yellow card) 87'; Cannon 61'	Stadium: The Valley; Attendance: 0 Referee: Bobby Madley

6 February 2021 25	Portsmouth	2–2	Plymouth Argyle	Portsmouth
15:00 GMT	Cannon (yellow card) 72'; Naylor (yellow card) 84'; Curtis 86'; Bolton 87'	Report	Jephcott 71', 82'	Stadium: Fratton Park; Attendance: 0 Referee: Will Finnie

9 February 2021 26	Portsmouth	2–0	Swindon Town	Portsmouth
19:00 GMT	Curtis 8'; Harrison 64' (pen.)	Report	Payne (yellow card) 45'	Stadium: Fratton Park; Attendance: 0 Referee: John Busby

16 February 2021 27	Bristol Rovers	3–1	Portsmouth	Bristol
19:00 GMT	McCormick (yellow card) 6'; Williams (yellow card) 27'; Ayunga 34', 44'; Leahy 70' (pen.)	Report	Marquis 26', (penalty missed) 90+6'; Johnson (yellow card) 66'; Raggett (yellow card) 69'	Stadium: Memorial Stadium; Attendance: 0 Referee: Chris Sarginson

20 February 2021 28	Portsmouth	0–1	Blackpool	Portsmouth
15:00 GMT	Cannon (yellow card) 71'; Curtis (yellow card) 90+3'	Report	Garbutt (yellow card) 19'; Simms (yellow card) 33'; Yates 82'; Gabriel (yellow card) 89'	Stadium: Fratton Park; Attendance: 0 Referee: Sam Allison

23 February 2021 29	Oxford United	0–1	Portsmouth	Oxford
19:00 GMT	Brannagan (yellow card) 45+1'	Report	Curtis (yellow card) 14'; Harness (yellow card) 45+1'; White 48'	Stadium: The Kassam Stadium; Attendance: 0 Referee: Graham Salisbury

27 February 2021 30	Portsmouth	1–1	Gillingham	Portsmouth
15:00 GMT	Raggett 32'; Mnoga (yellow card) 82'	Report	Oliver 40'; O'Keefe (yellow card) 76'	Stadium: Fratton Park; Attendance: 0 Referee: Tim Robinson

2 March 2021 31	Doncaster Rovers	2–1	Portsmouth	Doncaster
19:00 GMT	Taylor (yellow card) 10'; James 12'; Okenabirhie 70'; Smith (yellow card) 90+4'	Report	Harness (yellow card) 15'; Nicolaisen (yellow card) 59'; Marquis (yellow card) 82' (goal) 90+4'	Stadium: Keepmoat Stadium; Referee: Ross Joyce

6 March 2021 32	Northampton Town	4–1	Portsmouth	Northampton
15:00 GMT	Watson 20', 23'; Horsfall 32'; Hoskins 43'; Miller (yellow card) 85'; Mitchell (yellow card) 88'	Report	Marquis (yellow card) 34'; Harrison 73' (pen.)	Stadium: Sixfields Stadium; Attendance: Behind Closed Doors; Referee: Andy Haines

9 March 2021 33	Portsmouth	0–2	Sunderland	Portsmouth
19:45 GMT		Report	Wyke 13'; Jones 58'; Sanderson (yellow card) 66'	Stadium: Fratton Park; Attendance: 0 Referee: David Rock

16 March 2021 34	Peterborough United	1–0	Portsmouth	Peterborough
19:00 GMT	Nicolaisen 32' (o.g.); Beevers (yellow card) 77'	Report	Whatmough (yellow card) 41'; White (yellow card) 83'	Stadium: Weston Homes Stadium; Attendance: 0 Referee: James Oldham

20 March 2021 35	Portsmouth	2–1	Ipswich Town	Portsmouth
13:00 GMT	Whatmough (yellow card) 18'; Naylor 41'; Curtis (yellow card) 52'; Cannon (yellow card) 56'; Harness 72'; Jacobs (yellow card) 82'	Report	Norwood 32'; Edwards (yellow card) 66'; Chambers (yellow card) 66'; Bishop (yellow card) 71'	Stadium: Fratton Park; Attendance: 0 Referee: Alan Young

27 March 2021 36	Shrewsbury Town	1–2	Portsmouth	Shrewsbury
15:00 GMT	Ogbeta 52'	Report	Harness 25'; Marquis 36', (red card) 68'	Stadium: Montgomery Waters Meadow; Attendance: 0 Referee: Ben Speedie

2 April 2021 37	Portsmouth	2–1	Rochdale	Portsmouth
15:00 BST	Williams 5', (yellow card) 76'; Curtis 37'	Report	Keohane (yellow card) 24'; Beesley 90+3'	Stadium: Fratton Park; Attendance: 0 Referee: Brett Huxtable

5 April 2021 38	Wigan Athletic	0–1	Portsmouth	Wigan
15:00 BST	Ojo (yellow card) 34'; Robinson (yellow card) 41'; Tilt (yellow card) 90+4'	Report	Cannon 46'; Brown (yellow card) 90+6'	Stadium: DW Stadium; Attendance: 0 Referee: Tom Nield

10 April 2021 39	Portsmouth	1–2	Burton Albion	Portsmouth
15:00 BST	Daniels 88'	Report	Clare (yellow card) 40'; Fondop 45'; Powell 47'	Stadium: Fratton Park; Attendance: 0 Referee: John Busby

13 April 2021 40	Crewe Alexandra	0–0	Portsmouth	Crewe
18:00 BST	Lowery (yellow card) 20'; Offord (yellow card) 45+4'	Report	Raggett (yellow card) 28'; Williams (yellow card) 49'; Marquis (penalty missed) 59'; Johnson (yellow card) 77'	Stadium: Alexandra Stadium; Attendance: 0 Referee: Darren Drysdale

17 April 2021 41	Milton Keynes Dons	1–0	Portsmouth	Denbigh
12:30 BST	Lewington (yellow card) 31'; Fraser 41' (pen.); Jules (yellow card) 69'	Report	Daniels (yellow card) 19'; Whatmough (red card) 81'; Byers (yellow card) 90+4'	Stadium: Stadium:mk; Attendance: 0 Referee: Martin Coy

20 April 2021 42	Swindon Town	3–1	Portsmouth	Swindon
18:00 BST	Pitman 18', 61' (pen.); Thompson (yellow card) 72'; Smith 90+1'	Report	Daniels (yellow card) 60'; Curtis 82'; Nicolaisen (yellow card) 84'; Cannon (yellow card) 90+3'	Stadium: The County Ground; Attendance: 0 Referee: Ben Toner

24 April 2021 43	Portsmouth	1–0	Bristol Rovers	Portsmouth
13:00 BST	Curtis 27'	Report		Stadium: Fratton Park; Attendance: 0 Referee: Thomas Bramall

27 April 2021 44	Accrington Stanley	3–3	Portsmouth	Accrington
19:00 BST	Bishop 15'; Burgess 43'; Barclay (yellow card) 90+3'; Conneely (yellow card) 90+4'; Marquis 90+5' (o.g.)	Report	Marquis 49', 90+1'; Williams 54'; Curtis (yellow card) 84'; Cannon (yellow card) 86'	Stadium: Wham Stadium; Attendance: 0 Referee: Bobby Madley

1 May 2021 45	AFC Wimbledon	1–3	Portsmouth	Wimbledon
15:00 BST	Pigott (yellow card) 15', (goal) 23'; Dobson (yellow card) 19'; Alexander (yellow card) 37'	Report	Curtis 24', (yellow card) 37'; Brown 45', 45+4'	Stadium: Plough Lane; Attendance: 0 Referee: Charles Breakspear

9 May 2021 46	Portsmouth	0–1	Accrington Stanley	Portsmouth
12:00 BST	Harness (yellow card) 18'; Downing (yellow card) 28'; Byers (yellow card) 64'; White (yellow card) 66'	Report	Phillips 23'; Rodgers (yellow card) 62'	Stadium: Fratton Park; Attendance: 0 Referee: Sam Purkiss

=== FA Cup ===
The draw for the first round was made on Monday 26, October. The second round draw was revealed on Monday, 9 November by Danny Cowley. The third round draw was made on 30 November, with Premier League and EFL Championship clubs all entering the competition.

Win Draw Loss

7 November 2020 First round	Ipswich Town	2–3 (a.e.t.)	Portsmouth	Ipswich
15:00 GMT	Hawkins (yellow card) 27'; Nolan 43'; Norwood 66' (yellow card) 112'; Donacien (yellow card) 109'	Report	Curtis 11'; Naylor 13'; Pring (yellow card) 87'; Raggett 111'	Stadium: Portman Road; Attendance: 0 Referee: Andy Haines

28 November 2020 Second round	Portsmouth	6–1	King's Lynn Town	Portsmouth
15:00 GMT	Nicolaisen 2'; Naylor 30' (yellow card) 63'; Raggett 51'; Harness 58'; Harrison 72' (pen.); Hiwula 80'	Report	McCauley (yellow card) 47'; Southwell 68'	Stadium: Fratton Park; Attendance: 0 Referee: Will Finnie

10 January 2021 Third round	Bristol City	2–1	Portsmouth	Bristol
13:30 GMT	Nagy (yellow card) 5'; Diédhiou 19'; Martin 83'	Report	Nicolaisen (yellow card) 32'; Johnson 45+1'; Naylor (yellow card) 82'	Stadium: Ashton Gate; Attendance: 0 Referee: Jarred Gillett

=== EFL Cup ===
Win Draw Loss

The first round draw was made on 18 August, live on Sky Sports, by Paul Merson. The draw for both the second and third round were confirmed on September 6, live on Sky Sports by Phil Babb.

29 August 2020 First round	Stevenage	3–3 (1–3 p)	Portsmouth	Stevenage
15:00 BST	List 9'; Carter 10'; Cuthbert 29'	Report	Curtis 21'; Evans 45+2'; Marquis 51'	Stadium: The Lamex Stadium; Attendance: 0 Referee: Sam Purkiss
	Penalties
	Effiong (penalty scored); Newton (penalty missed); Osborne (penalty missed); Coker (penalty missed)		(penalty scored) Marquis; (penalty scored) Curtis; (penalty scored) Brown

17 September 2020 Second round	Brighton & Hove Albion	4–0	Portsmouth	Falmer
19:45 BST	Mac Allister 38'; Jahanbakhsh 54'; Bernardo 58'; Gyökeres 71'	Report		Stadium: American Express Community Stadium; Attendance: 0 Referee: Matt Donohue

=== EFL Trophy ===
Win Draw Loss

The regional group stage draw was confirmed on 18 August. The second round draw was made by Matt Murray on 20 November, at St Andrew's. The third round was made on 10 December 2020 by Jon Parkin.

Pos	Div	Team	Pld	W	PW	PL	L	GF	GA	GD	Pts	Qualification
1	ACA	West Ham United U21	3	3	0	0	0	5	1	+4	9	Advance to Round 2
2	L1	Portsmouth	3	2	0	0	1	5	1	+4	6	Advance to Round 2
3	L2	Colchester United	3	1	0	0	2	6	4	+2	3	
4	L2	Southend United	3	0	0	0	3	2	12	−10	0	

Source: EFL.com

8 September 2020 Group stage	Portsmouth	2–0	Colchester United	Portsmouth
19:00 BST	Harness 37', 38'; Williams (yellow card) 80'; Pring (yellow card) 88'	Report	Sowunmi (yellow card) 40'	Stadium: Fratton Park; Attendance: 0 Referee: Craig Hicks

6 October 2020 Group stage	Southend United	0–3	Portsmouth	Southend-on-Sea
19:45 BST	Rush (yellow card) 35'; Coker (yellow card) 59'; Taylor (yellow card) 84'	Report	Marquis 21' (pen.); Curtis 40', 77'; Bolton (yellow card) 78'	Stadium: Roots Hall; Attendance: 0 Referee: Paul Howard

10 November 2020 Group stage	Portsmouth	0–1	West Ham United U21	Portsmouth
19:00 GMT	Mnoga (yellow card) 65'; Downing (yellow card) 67'	Report	Corbett 4'; Lewis (yellow card) 33'	Stadium: Fratton Park; Attendance: 0 Referee: Kevin Johnson

8 December 2020 Second round	Cheltenham Town	0–3	Portsmouth	Cheltenham
19:00 GMT	Tozer (yellow card) 43'	Report	Mnoga 15' (yellow card) 26'; Hiwula 29', 50'	Stadium: Whaddon Road; Attendance: 0 Referee: Neil Hair

12 January 2021 Third round	Peterborough United	5–1	Portsmouth	Peterborough
19:00 GMT	Taylor 15'; Beevers (yellow card) 20'; Clarke-Harris 29'; Kent 45+1'; Dembele 52'; Hamilton 87'	Report	Harrison 90+2'	Stadium: Weston Homes Stadium; Attendance: 0 Referee: Robert Lewis

=== 2019-20 EFL Trophy Final ===
The 2020 EFL Trophy final was originally scheduled for 5 April 2020, but was postponed because of the effects of the COVID-19 pandemic in the United Kingdom and eventually rescheduled for 13 March 2021.

13 March 2021 Final	Portsmouth	0–0 (a.e.t.) (2–4 p)	Salford City	London
15:00 GMT	Bolton (yellow card) 73'; Naylor (yellow card) 96'; Brown (yellow card) 114'	Report	Towell (yellow card) 14'; Lowe (yellow card) 90+1'; Touray (yellow card) 118'	Stadium: Wembley Stadium; Attendance: 0 Referee: Carl Boyeson
	Penalties
	Williams (penalty missed); Curtis (penalty missed); Brown (penalty scored); Raggett (penalty scored)		(penalty scored) Burgess; (penalty scored) Dieseruvwe; (penalty scored) Thomas-Asante; (penalty scored) Lowe

== Statistics ==
=== Appearances and goals ===
As of match(es) played 9 May 2021

Players with no appearances are not included on the list
Italics indicate a loaned in player

No.	Pos	Nat	Player	Total		League One		FA Cup		EFL Cup		EFL Trophy (Note: Includes the 2020 EFL Trophy final)	
No.	Pos	Nat	Player	Apps	Goals	Apps	Goals	Apps	Goals	Apps	Goals	Apps	Goals
1	GK	(Scotland) SCO	Craig MacGillivray	52	0	46+0	0	2+0	0	1+1	0	2+0	0
2	DF	(England) ENG	Callum Johnson	46	1	39+1	0	3+0	1	0+0	0	1+2	0
3	DF	(England) ENG	Lee Brown	35	2	28+4	2	1+0	0	1+0	0	0+1	0
4	MF	(England) ENG	Tom Naylor	53	8	46+0	6	3+0	2	2+0	0	2+0	0
5	DF	(England) ENG	Paul Downing	9	0	2+1	0	0+0	0	1+1	0	4+0	0
6	DF	(England) ENG	Jack Whatmough	38	2	32+2	2	0+1	0	1+0	0	2+0	0
7	FW	(India) IND	Ryan Williams	49	5	33+8	5	3+0	0	1+1	0	2+1	0
8	MF	(England) ENG	Ben Close	28	1	13+9	1	1+1	0	0+0	0	3+1	0
9	FW	(England) ENG	John Marquis	49	18	35+6	16	2+1	0	2+0	1	3+0	1
10	FW	(Wales) WAL	Ellis Harrison	31	6	11+14	4	1+2	1	0+1	0	1+1	1
11	FW	(Republic of Ireland) IRL	Ronan Curtis	49	14	36+6	10	2+0	1	2+0	1	2+1	2
13	DF	(England) ENG	James Bolton	20	1	8+5	1	0+0	0	2+0	0	5+0	0
14	MF	(England) ENG	Andy Cannon	48	2	31+12	2	2+0	0	0+2	0	0+1	0
15	DF	(Denmark) DEN	Rasmus Nicolaisen	27	1	12+9	0	3+0	1	0+0	0	3+0	0
16	MF	(Scotland) SCO	George Byers	15	0	4+10	0	0+0	0	0+0	0	1+0	0
17	MF	(England) ENG	Bryn Morris	18	0	5+4	0	0+2	0	2+0	0	4+1	0
19	FW	(Republic of Ireland) IRL	Marcus Harness	53	10	42+4	7	3+0	1	2+0	0	1+1	2
20	DF	(England) ENG	Sean Raggett	52	5	45+0	3	3+0	2	2+0	0	2+0	0
21	DF	(England) ENG	Charlie Daniels	18	1	10+7	1	0+0	0	0+0	0	1+0	0
23	MF	(England) ENG	Harvey White	22	1	5+16	1	0+0	0	0+0	0	1+0	0
24	FW	(England) ENG	Michael Jacobs	22	2	12+8	2	1+0	0	0+0	0	0+1	0
26	FW	(England) ENG	Jordy Hiwula	15	3	1+8	0	0+2	1	0+0	0	4+0	2
28	FW	(Malta) MLT	Alfie Bridgman	1	0	0+0	0	0+0	0	0+0	0	0+1	0
30	MF	(Wales) WAL	Harry Jewitt-White	2	0	0+0	0	0+0	0	0+0	0	1+1	0
31	FW	(South Korea) KOR	Lee Suk-jae	2	0	0+0	0	0+0	0	0+0	0	0+2	0
32	MF	(England) ENG	Charlie Bell	3	0	0+0	0	0+0	0	0+0	0	2+1	0
33	MF	(England) ENG	Harrison Brook	1	0	0+0	0	0+0	0	0+0	0	0+1	0
34	MF	(Northern Ireland) NIR	Gerard Storey	1	0	0+0	0	0+0	0	0+0	0	0+1	0
35	GK	(England) ENG	Alex Bass	5	0	0+0	0	1+0	0	1+0	0	3+0	0
36	FW	(Northern Ireland) NIR	Eoin Taggart	1	0	0+0	0	0+0	0	0+0	0	1+0	0
37	DF	(Tanzania) TAN	Haji Mnoga	9	1	3+2	0	0+1	0	0+0	0	3+0	1
38	MF	(England) ENG	Harry Kavanagh	2	0	0+0	0	0+0	0	0+0	0	2+0	0
39	MF	(Wales) WAL	Harvey Rew	2	0	0+0	0	0+0	0	0+0	0	2+0	0
40	FW	(England) ENG	Alfie Stanley	2	0	0+0	0	0+0	0	0+0	0	2+0	0
41	GK	(United States) USA	Duncan Turnbull	1	0	0+0	0	0+0	0	0+0	0	1+0	0
42	GK	(England) ENG	Taylor Seymour	1	0	0+0	0	0+0	0	0+0	0	0+1	0
Player(s) who featured whilst on loan but returned to parent club during the season:
23	DF	(England) ENG	Cameron Pring	15	0	6+3	0	2+0	0	1+0	0	3+0	0
Player(s) who featured but departed permanently during the season:
26	MF	(England) ENG	Gareth Evans	3	1	1+0	0	0+0	0	1+0	1	1+0	0

=== Disciplinary record ===
As of match(es) played 9 May 2021

Players with no cards are not included on the list
Italics indicate a loaned in player

No.	Pos	Nat	Player	Total		League One		FA Cup		EFL Cup		EFL Trophy (Note: Includes the 2020 EFL Trophy final)	
No.	Pos	Nat	Player	Yellow card	Red card	Yellow card	Red card	Yellow card	Red card	Yellow card	Red card	Yellow card	Red card
2	DF	(England) ENG	Callum Johnson	4	0	4	0	0	0	0	0	0	0
3	DF	(England) ENG	Lee Brown	6	0	4	0	1	0	0	0	1	0
4	MF	(England) ENG	Tom Naylor	10	0	7	0	2	0	0	0	1	0
5	DF	(England) ENG	Paul Downing	2	0	1	0	0	0	0	0	1	0
6	DF	(England) ENG	Jack Whatmough	5	2	5	2	0	0	0	0	0	0
7	FW	(India) IND	Ryan Williams	6	0	5	0	0	0	0	0	1	0
9	FW	(England) ENG	John Marquis	7	1	6	1	0	0	1	0	0	0
10	FW	(Wales) WAL	Ellis Harrison	3	0	3	0	0	0	0	0	0	0
11	FW	(Republic of Ireland) IRL	Ronan Curtis	8	0	8	0	0	0	0	0	0	0
13	DF	(England) ENG	James Bolton	2	0	0	0	0	0	0	0	2	0
14	MF	(England) ENG	Andy Cannon	9	0	9	0	0	0	0	0	0	0
15	DF	(Denmark) DEN	Rasmus Nicolaisen	4	0	3	0	1	0	0	0	0	0
16	MF	(Scotland) SCO	George Byers	2	0	2	0	0	0	0	0	0	0
17	MF	(England) ENG	Bryn Morris	1	0	1	0	0	0	0	0	0	0
19	FW	(Republic of Ireland) IRL	Marcus Harness	8	0	8	0	0	0	0	0	0	0
20	DF	(England) ENG	Sean Raggett	5	0	5	0	0	0	0	0	0	0
21	DF	(England) ENG	Charlie Daniels	2	0	2	0	0	0	0	0	0	0
23	MF	(England) ENG	Harvey White	2	0	2	0	0	0	0	0	0	0
24	FW	(England) ENG	Michael Jacobs	1	0	1	0	0	0	0	0	0	0
37	DF	(Tanzania) TAN	Haji Mnoga	3	0	1	0	0	0	0	0	2	0
Player(s) who featured whilst on loan but returned to parent club during the season:
23	DF	(England) ENG	Cameron Pring	2	0	0	0	1	0	0	0	1	0
Player(s) who featured but departed permanently during the season:
26	MF	(England) ENG	Gareth Evans	1	0	0	0	0	0	1	0	0	0
Squad Total				93	3	77	3	5	0	2	0	9	0
