= Taylor Seymour =

English footballer

Personal information
- Full name: Taylor Seymour
- Date of birth: 17 September 2001 (age 25)
- Place of birth: Brighton, England
- Height: 6 ft 3 in (1.91 m)
- Position: Goalkeeper

Team information
- Current team: Worthing
- Number: 13

Youth career
- –2019: Lewes

Senior career*
Years	Team	Apps	(Gls)
2019–2020	Lewes	2	(0)
2020–2021	Portsmouth	1	(0)
2021–2022	Burgess Hill Town	26	(0)
2021	→ Eastbourne Borough (loan)	1	(0)
2022	Crawley Town	0	(0)
2022	Eastbourne Borough	2	(0)
2022	→ Corinthian-Casuals (dual-reg)	5	(0)
2022–2023	Horsham	4	(0)
2023	Burgess Hill Town		
2023	→ Eastbourne Town (dual-reg)	2	(0)
2024–	Worthing		
2025	→ Sittingbourne (loan)		
- * Club domestic league appearances and goals as of 19:06, 15 January 2026 (UTC)

Taylor Seymour (born 17 September 2001) is an English professional footballer who plays as a goalkeeper for National League South club Worthing.

== Career ==
Born in Worthing, Seymour is a graduate of the Lewes academy, featuring twice for the Rooks first team in cup matches.

Seymour signed his first professional contract with Portsmouth on 15 September 2020 following a successful trial. He made his professional debut with Portsmouth in a 5–1 EFL Trophy loss to Peterborough United on 12 January 2021.

In August 2021, he joined Isthmian League South East Division club Burgess Hill Town.

On 7 January 2022, Seymour signed for EFL League Two club Crawley Town on a contract until the end of the season.

On 16 August 2022, Seymour signed for Eastbourne Borough. In November 2022, Seymour signed for Corinthian-Casuals on a dual-registration basis.

In February 2023, Seymour was the first recipient of the Isthmian League Golden Gloves Award for 2023.

Seymour joined Burgess Hill Town in summer 2023, but torn meniscus in his right knee in August, ruling him out for the entire 2023–24 season. He returned to Worthing in summer 2024, but suffered a ruptured ACL and torn meniscus in his left knee in October. In July 2025, he extended his contract with Worthing for the 2025–26 season. On 11 November 2025, he joined Sittingbourne on a 28-day loan.

== Career statistics ==
As of match played 5 July 2024

Appearances and goals by club, season and competition
Club	Season	League			FA Cup		EFL Cup		Other		Total	
Club	Season	Division	Apps	Goals	Apps	Goals	Apps	Goals	Apps	Goals	Apps	Goals
Lewes	2019–20	Isthmian League; Premier Division	0	0	0	0	—		2 (Note: One appearance in Alan Turvey Trophy, one appearance in Sussex Senior Cup)	0	2	0
Portsmouth	2020–21	League One	0	0	0	0	1	0	1 (Note: Appearance(s) in EFL Trophy)	0	1	0
Burgess Hill Town	2021–22	Isthmian League; South East Division	9	0	3	0	—		1 (Note: Appearance(s) in FA Trophy)	0	13	0
Eastbourne Borough (loan)	2021–22	National League South	1	0	0	0	—		0	0	1	0
Eastbourne Borough	2022–23	National League South	2	0	0	0	—		0	0	2	0
Corinthian-Casuals (dual-reg)	2022	Isthmian League; Premier Division	5	0	0	0	—		0	0	5	0
Horsham	2022-23	Isthmian League Premier Division	6	0	0	0	-		0	0	0	0
Burgess Hill Town	2023–24	Isthmian League South East Division	0	0	0	0	-		0	0	0	0
Eastbourne Town (dual-reg)	2023-24	Southern Combination Football League Premier Division	2	0	0	0	-		0	0	2	0
Career total			29	0	3	0	1	0	4	0	37	0
