= Charlie Bell (footballer, born 2002) =

English footballer

Personal information
- Full name: Charlie George Bell
- Date of birth: 24 December 2002 (age 23)
- Place of birth: Portsmouth, England
- Position: Midfielder

Team information
- Current team: Moneyfields

Youth career
- 2009–2021: Portsmouth

Senior career*
Years	Team	Apps	(Gls)
2020–2021	Portsmouth	0	(0)
2021–2022	Bognor Regis Town	42	(7)
2022	Horsham	2	(0)
2022–2023	Moneyfields	19	(9)
2023	AFC Portchester	7	(1)
2023–	Moneyfields	2	(0)
- * Club domestic league appearances and goals as of 19:09, 28 September 2022 (UTC)

Charlie George Bell (born 24 December 2002) is an English footballer who plays for Moneyfields as a centre midfielder.

== Club career ==
=== Portsmouth ===
Bell progressed through Pompey's youth categories after joining the club at the age of 6.

Bell made his Portsmouth debut in a 1–0 defeat vs West Ham United U21s on 10 November 2020 in the EFL Trophy. Bell played the first 79 minutes of the game in the central midfield position. After impressing Jackett in the game against West Ham, Bell again started against Cheltenham Town, playing 62 minutes in a 3–0 win.

At the end of the 2020–21 season, Bell was released by the League One side.

=== Bognor Regis Town ===
In August 2021, Bell joined Isthmian League Premier Division side Bognor Regis Town following his release from Pompey.

=== Horsham ===
In September 2022, Bell signed for Horsham.

=== Moneyfields ===
After a short spell with Horsham, Bell put pen to paper and signed for Wessex Premier Division side Moneyfields on Thursday 6 October 2022 and made his debut two days later, coming on as a 60th-minute substitute in a 3–0 away win against US Portsmouth.

== Career statistics ==
As of match played 12 January 2021

Appearances and goals by club, season and competition
Club	Season	League			FA Cup		League Cup		Other		Total	
Club	Season	Division	Apps	Goals	Apps	Goals	Apps	Goals	Apps	Goals	Apps	Goals
Portsmouth	2020–21	League One	0	0	0	0	0	0	3 (Note: Appearance(s) in EFL Trophy)	0	3	0
Career total			0	0	0	0	0	0	3	0	3	0
