= Alfie Bridgman =

English footballer (born 2004)

Personal information
- Full name: Alfie Bridgman
- Date of birth: 11 April 2004 (age 22)
- Place of birth: Portsmouth, England
- Position: Winger

Team information
- Current team: Moneyfields

Youth career
- 2011–2021: Portsmouth

Senior career*
Years	Team	Apps	(Gls)
2021–2023	Portsmouth	0	(0)
2022	→ Bognor Regis Town (loan)	8	(2)
2022–2023	→ Bognor Regis Town (loan)	25	(6)
2023	Eastbourne Borough	7	(0)
2023–2024	Bognor Regis Town	24	(4)
2024	Basingstoke Town	5	(0)
2024	→ Thatcham Town (loan)	7	(1)
2024–2025	Fareham Town	22	(10)
2025–2026	Larne	1	(0)
2026–	Moneyfields	33	(13)

International career^{‡}
2022–2023	Malta U19	6	(1)
2023–	Malta U21	8	(1)
- * Club domestic league appearances and goals as of 16:33, 16 January 2026 (UTC) ‡ National team caps and goals as of 08:34, 30 July 2026 (UTC)

Alfie Bridgman (born 11 April 2004) is a footballer who plays as a winger for Isthmian League South Central Division club Moneyfields. Born in England, he represents Malta at youth international level.

== Club career ==
=== Portsmouth ===
On 12 January 2021, Bridgman made his Pompey debut, coming on as a sub in a 5–1 defeat at Peterborough United in the EFL Trophy.

On 22 March 2022, Bridgman joined Bognor Regis Town on loan.

On 2 May 2022, it was announced that Bridgman had signed a third year scholarship deal with Portsmouth after his 'good spell' with Bognor Regis Town.

In August 2022, Bridgman returned on loan to Bognor Regis Town.

=== Eastbourne Borough ===
Following his release from Portsmouth, Bridgman joined National League South club Eastbourne Borough ahead of the 2023/24 season. On 28 November 2023, he left the club by mutual consent.

Later that month, he returned to Bognor Regis Town, this time joining on a permanent deal.

In July 2024, Bridgman joined Southern League Premier Division side Basingstoke Town. In October 2024, he dropped down a division to join Thatcham Town on loan. In December 2024, he was playing for Wessex League side Fareham Town alongside his older brother.

In August 2025, Bridgman joined NIFL Premiership side Larne. He was released by mutual agreement in January 2026.

In January 2026, he returned to England, joining Isthmian League South Central Division club Moneyfields.

== International career ==
In June 2022, Bridgman was called up to the Malta under-19 squad for the first time. In June 2023, he was called up to the Malta squad for the 2023 UEFA European Under-19 Championship.

== Career statistics ==
As of end of 2023–24 season

Club	Season	League			FA Cup		League Cup		Other		Total	
Club	Season	Division	Apps	Goals	Apps	Goals	Apps	Goals	Apps	Goals	Apps	Goals
Portsmouth	2020–21	League One	0	0	0	0	0	0	1	0	1	0
Portsmouth	2021–22	League One	0	0	0	0	0	0	1	0	1	0
Portsmouth	2022–23	League One	0	0	0	0	0	0	0	0	0	0
Portsmouth	Total		0	0	0	0	0	0	2	0	2	0
Bognor Regis Town (loan)	2021–22	Isthmian Premier Division	8	2	0	0	—		0	0	8	2
Bognor Regis Town (loan)	2022–23	Isthmian Premier Division	25	6	2	0	—		5	0	32	6
Bognor Regis Town (loan)	Total		33	8	2	0	0	0	5	0	40	8
Eastbourne Borough	2023–24	National League South	7	0	0	0	—		2 (Note: One appearance in the FA Trophy, one appearance in the Sussex Senior Cup)	0	9	0
Bognor Regis Town	2023–24	Isthmian Premier Division	24	4	0	0	—		0	0	24	4
Career total			64	12	2	0	0	0	9	0	75	12

== Personal life ==
Bridgman is of Maltese descent with his grandmother having been born in the country. He attended Purbrook Park School growing up. His older brother Stanley also played for Portsmouth before having a spell playing in Finland for Pallo-Iirot.
