= Gerard Storey =

Northern Irish footballer

Personal information
- Full name: Gerard Ciaran Storey
- Date of birth: 2 May 2002 (age 24)
- Place of birth: Belfast, Northern Ireland
- Position: Midfielder

Team information
- Current team: Warrenpoint Town
- Number: 10

Youth career
- ????–2018: Ridgeway Rovers
- 2018–2019: Portadown

Senior career*
Years	Team	Apps	(Gls)
2018–2019	Portadown	13	(1)
2019–2021	Portsmouth	0	(0)
2020	→ Gosport Borough (loan)	7	(0)
2021	→ Carrick Rangers (loan)	13	(0)
2021–2022	Derry City	3	(0)
2022–2024	Cliftonville	2	(0)
2023	→ Annagh United (loan)	18	(0)
2023-2024	→ Lisburn Distillery (loan)	21	(7)
2024-2025	Newington	23	(2)
2025	Dundela	12	(0)
2025-2026	Lisburn Distillery	7	(0)
2026	Armagh City	13	(2)
2026-	Warrenpoint Town	2	(0)

International career
2018	Northern Ireland U17	1	(0)
- * Club domestic league appearances and goals as of 20:57, 14 July 2023 (UTC)

Gerard Storey (born 2 May 2002) is a Northern Irish footballer who plays as a midfielder for NIFL Championship team Warrenpoint Town.

== Club career ==
=== Portadown ===
Storey made his Portadown debut on the 18 August 2018, coming off the bench in a 2–0 win versus PSNI.

=== Portsmouth ===
In May 2019, Storey signed for Portsmouth, joining up with their youth team on a 2-year scholarship deal.

On 16 September 2020, Storey joined Southern League side Gosport Borough on loan, he made 9 appearances without scoring before returning to Pompey during the Southern League's COVID break.

Storey made his Portsmouth debut against Cheltenham Town on the 8 December 2020, coming on as a sub in a 3–0 win in the EFL Trophy.

On 12 January 2021, Storey moved on loan to NIFL Premiership side Carrick Rangers.

During April 2021, it was announced that Storey had agreed to part ways with Portsmouth at the end of the season.

== Career statistics ==
As of match played 10 April 2021

Club	Season	League			National Cup		League Cup		Other		Total	
Club	Season	Division	Apps	Goals	Apps	Goals	Apps	Goals	Apps	Goals	Apps	Goals
Portadown	2018–19	NIFL Championship	13	0	0	0	2	0	0	0	15	0
Portsmouth	2020–21	League One	0	0	0	0	0	0	1	0	1	0
Gosport Borough (loan)	2020–21	Southern League Premier Division South	7	0	2	0	0	0	0	0	9	0
Carrick Rangers (loan)	2020–21	NIFL Premiership	13	0	0	0	0	0	0	0	13	0
Career total			33	0	2	0	2	0	1	0	38	0
