= Harry Jewitt-White =

Welsh footballer (born 2004)

Personal information
- Full name: Harry George Jewitt-White
- Date of birth: 26 March 2004 (age 22)
- Place of birth: Portsmouth, England
- Height: 1.83 m (6 ft 0 in)
- Position: Midfielder

Team information
- Current team: Crusaders
- Number: 8

Youth career
- 2011–: Portsmouth

Senior career*
Years	Team	Apps	(Gls)
2020–2024	Portsmouth	2	(0)
2022	→ Havant & Waterlooville (loan)	2	(0)
2022	→ Gosport Borough (loan)	11	(1)
2023–2024	→ Havant & Waterlooville (loan)	33	(2)
2024–	Crusaders	34	(3)

International career^{‡}
2019–2020	Wales U16	5	(0)
2021–	Wales U18	3	(0)
2022–	Wales U19	6	(0)
- * Club domestic league appearances and goals as of 26 April 2026 ‡ National team caps and goals as of 15:26, 13 October 2018 (UTC)

Harry Jewitt-White (born 26 March 2004) is a professional footballer who plays for NIFL Premiership team Crusaders as a midfielder.

His mother is Welsh, his father English, making him eligible to play for both. However Jewitt-White has decided to represent Wales.

== Club career ==
=== Portsmouth ===
Jewitt-White made his Portsmouth debut in a 1–0 defeat vs West Ham United U21s on 10 November 2020 in the EFL Trophy. At the age of 16 years and 230 days old, he became the third-youngest player in Portsmouth's post-World War II history.

On 12 January 2021, he made his second Portsmouth appearance, starting in a 5–1 defeat at Peterborough United in the EFL Trophy.

On 21 January 2022, Jewitt-White joined Havant & Waterlooville on loan until the end of the season.

On 16 August 2022 he joined Gosport Borough on loan until January 2023.

On 1 August 2023, he returned to Havant & Waterlooville on a season-long loan deal.

On 1 May 2024, Portsmouth said the player would be released when his contract expired in the summer.

== International career ==
Jewitt-White is eligible to represent both England and Wales at international level. In October 2020 and March 2021, Jewitt-White was called up to Wales U17 training camps but no games were played due to the COVID-19 pandemic.

On 16 August 2021, Jewitt-White was called up to Wales U18 for the first time. He made his debut on 3 September 2021, coming on at half time in a 1-1 draw with England U18.

== Career statistics ==
As of match played 19 December 2023

Club	Season	League			FA Cup		League Cup		Other		Total	
Club	Season	Division	Apps	Goals	Apps	Goals	Apps	Goals	Apps	Goals	Apps	Goals
Portsmouth	2020–21	League One	0	0	0	0	0	0	2	0	2	0
Portsmouth	2021–22	League One	0	0	0	0	0	0	3	0	3	0
Portsmouth	2022–23	League One	2	0	0	0	0	0	0	0	2	0
Portsmouth	2023–24	League One	0	0	0	0	0	0	2	0	2	0
Portsmouth	Total		2	0	0	0	0	0	7	0	9	0
Havant & Waterlooville (loan)	2021–22	National League South	2	0	0	0	0	0	0	0	2	0
Gosport Borough (loan)	2022–23	Southern League Prem South	11	1	1	0	0	0	0	0	12	1
Career total			15	1	1	0	0	0	7	0	23	1
