= Peter Gregory (footballer) =

English footballer

Personal information
- Date of birth: 25 July 1992 (age 34)
- Place of birth: Eastbourne, England
- Height: 5 ft 10 in (1.78 m)
- Positions: Full-back; winger

Youth career
- Brighton
- Portsmouth

Senior career*
Years	Team	Apps	(Gls)
2010–2011	Portsmouth	1	(0)
2011–2012	Eastbourne Borough	0	(0)
2012	Lewes	10	(0)
2012–2013	Nottingham Forest	0	(0)
2014	Ventura County Fusion	2	(0)
2014	Beira-Mar	6	(0)
2018–2019	Orange County		
2019	Lewes		
2021–2022	Whitehawk	11	(1)
- * Club domestic league appearances and goals as of 26 April 2022

Peter Gregory (born 25 July 1992) is an English footballer who last played for Whitehawk. He is a full back capable of playing on either flank, he can also play as a winger.

== Club career ==
=== Early career ===
Born in Eastbourne, Gregory started his footballing career at Brighton's youth setup before moving to Portsmouth Academy; after being offered a scholarship deal with the latter in June 2008, he was a regular first choice in the Premiership Reserve League. He won man of the match awards in FA Youth Cup twice, whilst being also first-choice left back with the under-16s and first-choice right back with the under-18s.

=== Portsmouth ===
Gregory signed a one-year professional deal with Portsmouth on 1 July 2010, being assigned number 39. He played in pre-season matches against Fulham and Bournemouth, and was also taken on the club's North American Tour playing against Club América, D.C. United, FC Edmonton and Ventura County Fusion.

Gregory made his first-team debut on 7 August, replacing John Utaka in the 83rd minute of a 0–2 Championship away loss against Coventry City. He appeared in further twelve minutes in a 2–1 away success against Stevenage in the Football League Cup two days later, and featured on the bench in a 1–1 home draw against Reading on 14 August.

Gregory made no further appearances for Pompey during the campaign, and was released along with nine players on 15 May 2011.

=== Eastbourne/Lewes ===
On 15 November, Gregory signed a contract with Eastbourne Borough. However, after being sparingly used, he joined Lewes in March 2012.

Gregory played in ten matches for the Rooks during the season, all as a starter.

=== Nottingham Forest ===
On 27 September Gregory left Lewes and joined Nottingham Forest. After playing regularly with the U21s, he was released in May of the following year.

=== Trial periods ===
Shortly after being released, Gregory moved abroad for the first time in his career, joining Hansa Rostock in a trial basis. In January of the following year he was selected for the North American Soccer League Combine at the University of California, after training for a couple of days with Chivas USA in October.

=== Ventura County Fusion ===
In May 2014 Gregory joined Premier Development League side Ventura County Fusion. He made his debut for the club on 8 May, and scored the winning goal in their first round US Open Cup game, a 2–1 win over CD Aguiluchos.

=== Beira-Mar ===
On 12 July 2014 Gregory switched teams and countries again, signing a one-year deal with S.C. Beira-Mar. He made his debut for the club on 17 August, replacing Bilal Sebaihi in the 78th minute of a 0–1 away loss against Oriental in the Segunda Liga. On 11 December 2014, Gregory announced on his official site that he had left the club.

=== Return to America ===
In 2018, Gregory returned to America to sign for National Premier Soccer League side Orange County and he continued to play for the club in the 2019 season too.

=== Return to Lewes ===
Gregory returned to England and rejoined Lewes on 7 September 2019.

=== Whitehawk ===
After a break from the game, Gregory signed for Whitehawk in November 2021, playing under Ross Standen, assistant manager from his Lewes days, before leaving at the end of the season.
