= Alfie Stanley =

English footballer (born 2001)

Personal information
- Full name: Alfie Frederick James Stanley
- Date of birth: November 2001 (age 24–25)
- Place of birth: Portsmouth, England
- Position: Forward

Team information
- Current team: Gosport Borough

Youth career
- 2007–2020: Portsmouth

Senior career*
Years	Team	Apps	(Gls)
2020–2021	Portsmouth	0	(0)
2020	→ Bognor Regis Town (loan)	6	(2)
2021–2023	Dorchester Town	72	(22)
2023–2024	AFC Totton	19	(5)
2024–	Gosport Borough	11	(2)
- * Club domestic league appearances and goals as of 08:56, 22 May 2024 (UTC)

Alfie Stanley (born 2001) is an English semi-professional footballer who plays as a striker for Gosport Borough.

== Club career ==
=== Portsmouth ===
Stanley progressed through Pompey's youth categories after joining the club at the age of 6. On 16 September 2020, Stanley joined Isthmian League side Bognor Regis Town on loan, he made 6 appearances and scored 2 goals before returning to Pompey.

Stanley made his Portsmouth debut in a 1–0 defeat vs West Ham United U21s on 10 November 2020 in the EFL Trophy. Stanley played 68 minutes of the game.

Stanley again started against Cheltenham Town, playing 79 minutes and registering an assist in a 3–0 win.

=== Non-league ===
He joined Dorchester Town in September 2021, he quickly became a hit with the supporters by netting a second half hat trick away to Tiverton Town. He completed his treble with a lob from the half way line. Stanley went onto win player of the season for the 21/22 season.

In June 2023, Stanley joined Southern League Premier Division South side AFC Totton after two seasons with Dorchester Town.

In February 2024, he joined divisional rivals Gosport Borough on a deal until the end of the season.

== Career statistics ==
As of match played 8 December 2020

Club	Season	League			FA Cup		League Cup		Other		Total	
Club	Season	Division	Apps	Goals	Apps	Goals	Apps	Goals	Apps	Goals	Apps	Goals
Portsmouth	2020–21	League One	0	0	0	0	0	0	2	0	2	0
Bognor Regis Town (loan)	2020–21	Isthmian Premier Division	6	0	2	0	0	0	0	0	8	0
Career total			6	0	2	0	0	0	2	0	10	0
