= Harry Kavanagh (footballer) =

English footballer (born 2002)

Personal information
- Full name: Harry John Kavanagh
- Date of birth: 5 February 2002 (age 24)
- Place of birth: Portsmouth, England
- Position: Defender

Team information
- Current team: Havant and Waterlooville FC

Youth career
- 2008–2020: Portsmouth

Senior career*
Years	Team	Apps	(Gls)
2020–2021	Portsmouth	2	(0)
2020	→ Bognor Regis Town (loan)	14	(0)
2020	→ Gosport Borough (loan)	8	(0)
2021–2025	Gosport Borough	1	(0)
2025-2026	Havant and Waterlooville FC		
- * Club domestic league appearances and goals as of 23:47, 14 August 2021 (UTC)

Harry John Kavanagh (born 5 February 2002) is an English footballer who plays for Havant and Waterlooville FC.

== Club career ==
=== Portsmouth ===
Kavanagh progressed through Pompey's youth categories after joining the club at the age of 6.

Kavanagh had spells on loan in non-league playing for Bognor Regis Town and Gosport Borough.

Kavanagh made his Portsmouth debut in a 1–0 defeat vs West Ham United U21s on 10 November 2020 in the EFL Trophy.

On 12 January 2021, he made his second Portsmouth appearance, starting in a 5–1 defeat at Peterborough United in the EFL Trophy.

=== Gosport Borough ===
On 7 July 2021, Kavanagh signed for Gosport Borough.

On 14 August 2021, Kavanagh broke his collarbone during the first game of the season, putting him out of action for at least 6 weeks.

Retired from football after Disappointing everyone, In a statement Harry said "yeah I was never that good anyway"

== Career statistics ==
As of match played 14 August 2021

Appearances and goals by club, season and competition
Club	Season	League			FA Cup		League Cup		Other		Total	
Club	Season	Division	Apps	Goals	Apps	Goals	Apps	Goals	Apps	Goals	Apps	Goals
Portsmouth	2020–21	League One	0	0	0	0	0	0	2	0	2	0
Bognor Regis Town (loan)	2019–20	Isthmian Premier Division	9	0	0	0	0	0	0	0	9	0
Gosport Borough (loan)	2020–21	Southern League Premier Division South	5	0	1	0	0	0	1	0	7	0
Gosport Borough	2021–22	Southern League Premier Division South	1	0	0	0	0	0	0	0	1	0
Career total			15	0	1	0	0	0	3	0	19	0
