= Lee Suk-jae =

Korean association football player

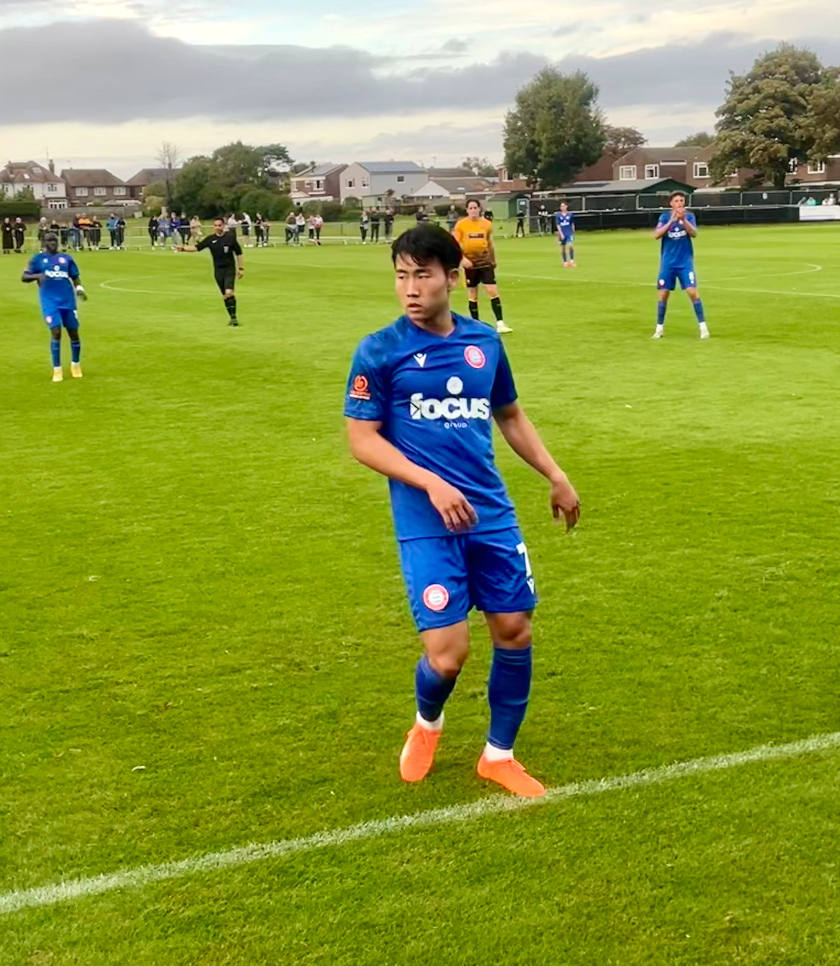

Personal information
- Date of birth: 8 July 2003 (age 23)
- Place of birth: Seoul, South Korea
- Height: 1.75 m (5 ft 9 in)
- Position: Midfielder

Team information
- Current team: Whitehawk

Youth career
- Daedong Elementary School
- United Services Portsmouth
- –2019: Pickwick
- 2019–2021: Portsmouth

Senior career*
Years	Team	Apps	(Gls)
2020–2021	Portsmouth	0	(0)
2021–2022	Gosport Borough	5	(0)
2022–2023	Havant & Waterlooville	1	(0)
2022–2023	→ Salisbury (loan)	19	(2)
2023	Worthing	8	(0)
2023–2024	Chichester City	13	(1)
2024	Baffins Milton Rovers		
2024–2025	Havant & Waterlooville	13	(0)
2025	Gosport Borough	1	(0)
2025–2026	Bognor Regis Town	22	(9)
2026–	Whitehawk	14	(2)
- * Club domestic league appearances and goals as of 16:23 5 November 2026 (UTC)

Lee Suk-jae (Korean: 이석재; born 8 July 2003) is a South Korean footballer who plays as a midfielder for Whitehawk.

== Career ==
Born in Seoul, Lee moved to Portsmouth as a child, playing for a number of teams locally before joining Portsmouth on a two-year scholarship in 2019. He made his senior debut on 10 November 2020 in an EFL Trophy match against West Ham United U21, also playing in the same competition against Cheltenham Town the following month. However, Lee turned down the offer of a professional contract from Pompey at the end of the season and left the club.

After trials with Sunderland, Brentford and Southampton, he joined Gosport Borough in November 2021. Lee made his debut for the club, coming on as a substitute, in a 2-1 loss against Taunton Town. He went on to make five appearances for Gosport Borough.

On 15 April 2022, Lee joined Havant & Waterlooville. His only appearance for the club came on 18 April 2022, coming on as a substitute, in a 3-0 win against Eastbourne Borough.

Lee joined Salisbury on dual registration on 26 August 2022. He made his debut for the club, coming on as a substitute, in a 2-1 win against Poole Town on 29 August 2022. Lee then scored his first goal for Salisbury, in a 2-0 win against Hanwell Town on 2 November 2022. His second goal for the club came on 21 February 2023, in a 5-1 win against Highworth Town. By the time Lee left Salisbury on 1 March 2023, he made nineteen appearances and scoring two times for the side.

Shortly after joining Worthing, Lee made his debut for the club, coming on as a substitute, in a 7-2 loss against Ebbsfleet United on 7 March 2023. At the end of the 2022-23 season, he made eight appearances for the side and left Worthing.

In August 2023, Lee joined Chichester City and made his debut for the club, in a 3-0 win against Broadbridge Heath on 19 August 2023. He then scored his first goal for Chichester City, in a 5-0 win against Hythe Town on 16 September 2023. However, his time at the club was marred by a shoulder injury on two separate occasions. By January, Lee left Chichester City.

After a brief spell at Baffins Milton Rovers, Lee re-joined Havant & Waterlooville. On 15 August 2024, he made his debut for the club for the second time, coming on as a late substitute, in a 3-0 win against Chertsey Town. Lee then scored his first goal for Havant & Waterlooville at the last minute, in a 3-0 win against Wallingford and Crowmarsh on 31 August 2024. On 22 August 2025, Lee returned to Gosport Borough. After one appearance, he joined Bognor Regis Town.

Lee signed for Brighton-based Isthmian League Premier Division side Whitehawk in July 2026.

== Career statistics ==
As of 5 February 2022

Appearances and goals by club, season and competition
Club	Season	League			National Cup		League Cup		Other		Total	
Club	Season	Division	Apps	Goals	Apps	Goals	Apps	Goals	Apps	Goals	Apps	Goals
Portsmouth	2020–21	League One	0	0	0	0	0	0	2 (Note: Appearance(s) in EFL Trophy)	0	2	0
Gosport Borough	2021–22	SFL Premier Division South	4	0	0	0	0	0	0	0	4	0
Havant & Waterlooville (loan)	2021–22	National League South	1	0	0	0	0	0	0	0	1	0
Career total			5	0	0	0	0	0	2	0	7	0
