= Tom Kilbey =

English footballer (born 1990)

Personal information
- Full name: Thomas Charles Kilbey
- Date of birth: 19 October 1990 (age 36)
- Place of birth: Leytonstone, England
- Height: 6 ft 3 in (1.91 m)
- Position: Midfielder

Youth career
- 2000–2007: Millwall

Senior career*
Years	Team	Apps	(Gls)
2007	Millwall	1	(0)
2007–2011	Portsmouth	2	(0)
2009	→ Dagenham & Redbridge (loan)	0	(0)
2011	→ Lincoln City (loan)	7	(0)
Total		9	(0)
- * Club domestic league appearances and goals as of 17:49, 30 April 2012 (UTC)

Thomas Charles Kilbey (born 19 October 1990) is an English television personality. He used to play as a professional footballer for Portsmouth F.C. Tom Kilbey grew up in East London and went to Forest School.

== Football career ==
=== Millwall ===
Born in Leytonstone, east London, Kilbey was originally signed to Millwall where he made his first team debut against Swansea City in September 2007 at the age of 16 in the Football League Trophy in a defensive midfield role.

=== Portsmouth and loans ===
In October 2007, Kilbey signed a contract with Premier League team Portsmouth moving for an undisclosed fee. During his first season on the south coast he established himself in the academy side with a strong pairing with fellow midfielder Marlon Pack. The 2008–09 season saw Kilbey play more regularly for the reserve team. This saw Kilbey put in some classy performances including scoring a hat-trick against West Bromwich Albion on 6 April 2009. He joined League Two team Dagenham & Redbridge on a month's loan on 1 September. His debut for Dagenham came against MK Dons in a Football League Trophy match.

In June 2010 he signed a one-year contract extension with the club, keeping him at the club until at least June 2011. He was part of the Portsmouth squad which toured North America and Canada in the Summer of 2010, scoring in the opening game 2–1 defeat at Club America. He made his league debut as a substitute at Watford on New Year's Day 2011. He scored his first goal for the club as a substitute against Brighton on 8 January 2011.

On 15 May 2011 it was announced that Kilbey would not be offered a new deal at Portsmouth and would therefore be leaving the club.

=== Lincoln City loan ===
On 24 March 2011, Kilbey was loaned again, this time to League Two club Lincoln City, until the end of the season. Kilbey received the 26 jersey and made his debut on the following day against Rotherham.

== TV career ==
Kilbey featured in series 4-7 of the ITV2 television show The Only Way Is Essex, in which his sister Cara also stars.
