= 2019 EFL Trophy final =

2019 EFL Trophy Final
- Match programme cover
- Event: 2018–19 EFL Trophy
Portsmouth	Sunderland
2	2
- After extra time Portsmouth won 5–4 on penalties
- Date: 31 March 2019
- Venue: Wembley Stadium, London
- Man of the Match: Matthew Clarke
- Referee: Dean Whitestone
- Attendance: 85,621

The 2019 EFL Trophy Final was a football match played at Wembley Stadium on 31 March 2019. It decided the winners of the 2018–19 EFL Trophy, the 35th edition of the competition, a knock-out tournament for the 48 teams in League One and League Two and 16 category one academy sides.

The Final was contested by League One sides Portsmouth and Sunderland, of which the winner received £100,000 and the Runners-Up received £50,000. This was the first Trophy final pitting two English football champions against each other in 31 years. It was also the first EFL Trophy Final to be contested by two former Premier League clubs.

The Portsmouth team used Wembley's West changing room, while Sunderland used the East. A coin toss decided that Sunderland had first choice on kit selection. This meant Portsmouth played in blue away socks to avoid clashing with Sunderland's first choice red socks.

Portsmouth won the final after coming from one goal behind with English forward Oliver Hawkins scoring the winning penalty kick in the shootout to hand Portsmouth their first cup trophy since the 2008 FA Cup. Portsmouth centre back, Matthew Clarke, was named man of the match. The game was attended by 85,021 people, making it the highest attended match in the UK and the second highest in Europe that weekend. It set a new attendance record for the Football League Trophy, surpassing the 1988 final.

== Route to the final ==
=== Portsmouth ===
Pos	Lge	Team	Pld	W	PW	PL	L	GF	GA	GD	Pts	Qualification
1	L1	Portsmouth	3	3	0	0	0	8	2	+6	9	Round 2
2	ACA	Tottenham Hotspur U21	3	1	0	1	1	7	4	+3	4	Round 2
3	L1	Gillingham	3	1	0	0	2	2	9	−7	3	
4	L2	Crawley Town	3	0	1	0	2	2	4	−2	2	

Source: EFL.com

4 September 2018 Group stages	Portsmouth	4–0	Gillingham	Portsmouth
19:45 BST	Clarke 41'; Close 43'; Pitman 55' (pen.); Wheeler 90+1'	Report		Stadium: Fratton Park; Attendance: 2,011; Referee: Alan Young

9 October 2018 Group stages	Crawley Town	0–1	Portsmouth	Crawley
19:45 BST		Report	Donohue 37'	Stadium: Broadfield Stadium; Attendance: 1,268

13 November 2018 Group stages	Portsmouth	3–2	Tottenham Hotspur U21	Portsmouth
19:45 GMT	Green 50'; Evans 69'	Report	Patterson 20'; White 90'	Stadium: Fratton Park; Attendance: 3,138

4 December 2018 Second round	Portsmouth	2–1	Arsenal U21	Portsmouth
19:45 GMT	Pitman 10'; Green 83'	Report	Saka 66'	Stadium: Fratton Park; Attendance: 3,109

8 January 2019 Third round	Southend United	0–2	Portsmouth	Southend-on-Sea
19:45 GMT		Report	Dennis 6'; Evans 45+2'	Stadium: Roots Hall; Attendance: 1,649; Referee: Craig Hicks

22 January 2019 Quarter-final	Portsmouth	1–0	Peterborough United	Portsmouth
19:00 GMT	Close (yellow card) 74'; Wheeler 85'	Report		Stadium: Fratton Park; Attendance: 3,313

26 February 2019 Semi-final	Bury	0–3	Portsmouth	Bury
19:45 GMT		Report	Evans 61' (yellow card) 62'; Hawkins 64'; Curtis 77'	Stadium: Gigg Lane; Attendance: 3,900; Referee: Ross Joyce

=== Sunderland ===
Pos	Lge	Team	Pld	W	PW	PL	L	GF	GA	GD	Pts	Qualification
1	L1	Sunderland	3	2	1	0	0	4	1	+3	8	Round 2
2	ACA	Stoke City U21	3	1	1	1	0	3	2	+1	6	Round 2
3	L2	Carlisle United	3	1	0	1	1	5	6	−1	4	
4	L2	Morecambe	3	0	0	0	3	3	6	−3	0	

Source: EFL.com

4 September 2018 Group Game 1	Sunderland	0–0 (4–2 p)	Stoke City U21s	Sunderland
19:45 BST		Report		Stadium: Stadium of Light; Attendance: 7,644; Referee: Martin Coy
	Penalties
	Sinclair (penalty scored); McGeouch (penalty scored); O'Nien (penalty scored); Hume (penalty scored)		Campbell (penalty missed); Souttar (penalty missed); Sørensen (penalty scored); Szerető (penalty scored)

9 October 2018 Group Game 2	Sunderland	3–1	Carlisle United	Sunderland
19:45 BST	Kimpioka 3'; Robson 34'; Honeyman 63'; O'Nien (yellow card) 72'	Report	Nadesan 22'	Stadium: Stadium of Light; Attendance: 8,112; Referee: Ben Toner

13 November 2018 Group Game 3	Morecambe	0–1	Sunderland	Morecambe
19:45 GMT	Kenyon (yellow card) 35'; Cuvelier (yellow card) 45+2'; Thompson (yellow card) 54'	Report	Maja 90+1'	Stadium: Globe Arena; Attendance: 2,377; Referee: Paul Marsden

4 December 2018 Round 2	Sunderland	2–0	Notts County	Sunderland
19:45 GMT	Mumba (yellow card) 28'; Jones 22' (o.g.); Sinclair 73' (pen.)	Report	Hewitt (yellow card) 29'; Duffy (yellow card) 76'; Vaughan (yellow card) 86'	Stadium: Stadium of Light; Attendance: 8,580; Referee: Graham Salisbury

8 January 2019 Round 3	Sunderland	4–0	Newcastle United U21s	Sunderland
19:45 GMT	Mumba (yellow card) 42'; Watts 49' (o.g.); Wyke 52'; Maguire 78'; Kimpioka 86'	Report	Sangare (yellow card) 53'	Stadium: Stadium of Light; Attendance: 16,654; Referee: Tony Harrington

22 January 2019 Quarter-finals	Sunderland	2–0	Manchester City U21s	Sunderland
19:45 GMT	Cattermole (yellow card) 17'; Watmore 22'; Gooch 65'	Report	Ogbeta (yellow card) 31'; Pozo (yellow card) 90'; Braaf (yellow card) 90+2'	Stadium: Stadium of Light; Attendance: 14,679; Referee: Michael Salisbury

5 March 2019 Semi-finals	Bristol Rovers	0–2	Sunderland	Bristol
19:45 GMT	Nichols (yellow card) 38'; Craig (yellow card) 86'	Report	Grigg 44'; Morgan 47'	Stadium: Memorial Stadium; Attendance: 6,699; Referee: Michael Salisbury

== Match ==
31 March 2019
14:30 BST

Portsmouth	2–2 (a.e.t.)	Sunderland
Thompson 82'; Lowe 114'	Report	McGeady 38', 119'
Penalties
Evans (penalty scored); Pitman (penalty scored); Brown (penalty scored); Lowe (penalty scored); Hawkins (penalty scored)	5–4	(penalty scored) McGeady; (penalty missed) Cattermole; (penalty scored) Gooch; (penalty scored) Power; (penalty scored) O'Nien

Wembley Stadium, London
Attendance: 85,021
Referee: Dean Whitestone

Portsmouth	Sunderland

GK	15	(Scotland) Craig MacGillivray
RB	20	(England) Nathan Thompson
CB	6	(England) Christian Burgess
CB	5	(England) Matthew Clarke
LB	3	(England) Lee Brown
DM	7	(England) Tom Naylor
DM	33	(England) Ben Close		(substituted off) 113'
RM	10	(England) Jamal Lowe	(yellow card) 116'
CM	8	(Jersey) Brett Pitman
LM	11	(Republic of Ireland) Ronan Curtis	(yellow card) 32'	(substituted off) 56'
CF	22	(England) Omar Bogle		(substituted off) 69'
Substitutes:
GK	35	(England) Alex Bass
DF	38	(England) Brandon Haunstrup
DF	2	(England) Anton Walkes		(substituted on) 113'
MF	26	(England) Gareth Evans	(yellow card) 102'	(substituted on) 56'
MF	30	(England) Adam May
FW	32	(England) James Vaughan
FW	9	(England) Oliver Hawkins		(substituted on) 69'
Manager:
(Wales) Kenny Jackett

GK	1	(Scotland) Jon McLaughlin
RB	13	(England) Luke O'Nien
CB	12	(Northern Ireland) Tom Flanagan
CB	15	(England) Jack Baldwin	(yellow card) 80'
LB	16	(England) Reece James		(substituted off) 88'
DM	6	(England) Lee Cattermole
RM	23	(England) Grant Leadbitter		(substituted off) 95'
CM	17	(Scotland) Lewis Morgan		(substituted off) 73'
CM	10	(England) George Honeyman
LM	19	(Republic of Ireland) Aiden McGeady	(yellow card) 90'
CF	22	(Northern Ireland) Will Grigg		(substituted off) 77'
Substitutes:
GK	25	(Netherlands) Robbin Ruiter
DF	30	(Republic of Ireland) Jimmy Dunne
DF	33	(England) Denver Hume		(substituted on) 88'
MF	8	(Scotland) Dylan McGeouch
MF	11	(United States) Lynden Gooch		(substituted on) 73'
MF	27	(England) Max Power		(substituted on) 77'
FW	9	(England) Charlie Wyke		(substituted on) 95'
Manager:
(Scotland) Jack Ross
