= Sean Raggett =

English-Irish footballer (born 1994)

Personal information
- Full name: Sean Aidan Raggett
- Date of birth: 25 January 1994 (age 32)
- Place of birth: Gillingham, England
- Height: 6 ft 5 in (1.95 m)
- Position: Centre-back

Team information
- Current team: Colchester United

Youth career
- –2010: Gillingham

Senior career*
Years	Team	Apps	(Gls)
2010–2016	Dover Athletic	106	(8)
2010–2011	→ Sittingbourne (dual registration)	8	(0)
2012	→ Herne Bay (loan)		
2013	→ Whitstable Town (loan)		
2016–2017	Lincoln City	41	(5)
2017–2020	Norwich City	2	(0)
2017–2018	→ Lincoln City (loan)	23	(2)
2018–2019	→ Rotherham United (loan)	7	(1)
2019–2020	→ Portsmouth (loan)	26	(2)
2020–2024	Portsmouth	172	(11)
2024–2026	Rotherham United	18	(1)
2026	→ Cambridge United (loan)	3	(0)
2026–	Colchester United	0	(0)

International career^{‡}
2015	England C	1	(0)
- * Club domestic league appearances and goals as of 18:45, 2 July 2026 (UTC) ‡ National team caps and goals as of 15:01, 18 February 2017 (UTC)

Sean Aidan Raggett (born 25 January 1994) is a professional footballer who plays as a centre-back for EFL League Two club Colchester United.

== Career ==
=== Dover Athletic ===
Raggett, a product of Gillingham's academy, joined Dover Athletic at 16, where he would go on to make over 150 appearances. In October 2010, he joined Sittingbourne on a dual registration basis. He made his debut for the club as a substitute in a 1–0 defeat at Fleet Town on 30 October 2010. with his full debut coming in the following Saturday's 2–1 home defeat to Leatherhead where he "played well above the standard you would expect from a 16 year old". He made a total of seven starts and one substitute appearance for the club, with his final game coming in their last game of the season, a 2–2 draw at home to Godalming Town. In 2013 he had a loan spell at Isthmian League Division One South side Whitstable Town. It was at Dover, under the guidance of manager Chris Kinnear, that he learned his trade and as well as becoming a talented and uncompromising centre back, began to score trademark headed goals.

=== Lincoln City ===
A crowd favourite, his departure to Lincoln City in 2016 was a big loss to Dover but ultimately led to his big break. On the 18 February 2017 Raggett scored an 89th-minute winner in an FA Cup fifth round match against Premier League side Burnley taking Lincoln to The Competition's Quarter Finals, becoming the first non-League team to reach that stage in 103 years.

=== Norwich City ===
On 18 August 2017, Raggett joined Norwich City on a three-year deal for an undisclosed fee. As part of the deal, Raggett rejoined Lincoln City on loan until 1 January 2018. During the following preseason Norwich travelled to Lincoln City, a game in which Raggett, now back at Norwich, scored an "embarrassing own goal", giving the Imps a consolation goal in a 3–1 win for Norwich.

==== Rotherham United (loan) ====
On 25 July 2018, Raggett joined Rotherham United on a season-long loan deal with an option for Norwich to recall him in January. Although he stayed beyond January, the loan was ended prematurely due to Raggett requiring surgery for an ankle injury. He returned to Norwich in early March 2019.

==== Portsmouth (loan) ====
On 27 June 2019, Raggett joined Portsmouth on a season-long loan deal.

=== Portsmouth ===
On 3 August 2020, Raggett joined Portsmouth permanently, on a two-year deal after being released by Norwich. Raggett signed a new two-year deal at the end of a 2021–22 season that saw him win the Supporters' Player of the Season Award.

On 13 February 2024, Raggett became the Portsmouth player with the most appearances for the club in the 21st century, with 227 appearances, surpassing his former teammate Ronan Curtis. On 1 May 2024 the club said the player would be released when his contract expired.

=== Rotherham United ===
On 24 May 2024, Raggett agreed to return to League One side Rotherham United on a two-year deal.

On 2 February 2026, Raggett joined League Two club Cambridge United on loan for the remainder of the 2025–26 season. He made three appearances as the U's secured promotion.

On 8 May 2026, following Rotherham's relegation, the club announced that he would be departing the club upon the expiry of his contract.

=== Colchester United ===
On 1 July 2026, Raggett joined League Two club Colchester United, playing under manager Danny Cowley for the third time in his career after spells together at Lincoln City and Portsmouth.

== International career ==
Raggett was born in England to an Irish father from Cork. Raggett has declared his intention to represent the Republic of Ireland national football team internationally in the future. While playing semi-pro football at Dover, Sean Raggett was called up to the England national C team ahead of a friendly with Republic of Ireland under-21s on 1 June 2015.

== Career statistics ==
As of match played 14 March 2026

Appearances and goals by club, season and competition
Club	Season	League			FA Cup		League Cup		Other		Total	
Club	Season	Division	Apps	Goals	Apps	Goals	Apps	Goals	Apps	Goals	Apps	Goals
Dover Athletic	2010–11	Conference South	0	0	0	0	—		0	0	0	0
Dover Athletic	2011–12	Conference South	0	0	0	0	—		0	0	0	0
Dover Athletic	2012–13	Conference South	0	0	0	0	—		0	0	0	0
Dover Athletic	2013–14	Conference South	32	0	5	3	—		7 (Note: Four appearances in the FA Trophy, three in Conference South play-offs)	0	44	3
Dover Athletic	2014–15	Conference Premier	31	4	3	0	—		6 (Note: Appearances in the FA Trophy)	0	40	4
Dover Athletic	2015–16	National League	43	4	2	1	—		6 (Note: Five appearances and one goal in the FA Trophy, one in National League play-offs)	1	51	6
Dover Athletic	Total		106	8	10	4	—		19	1	135	13
Lincoln City	2016–17	National League	41	5	8	2	—		3	1	52	8
Norwich City	2017–18	Championship	2	0	0	0	0	0	0	0	2	0
Lincoln City (loan)	2017–18	League Two	23	2	0	0	0	0	2 (Note: Appearances in EFL Trophy)	1	25	3
Rotherham United (loan)	2018–19	Championship	7	1	1	0	2	0	0	0	10	1
Portsmouth (loan)	2019–20	League One	26	2	3	0	1	0	8 (Note: Six appearances in EFL trophy, two appearances in EFL League One play-offs)	0	38	2
Portsmouth	2020–21	League One	45	3	3	2	2	0	2	0	52	5
Portsmouth	2021–22	League One	45	6	2	0	1	0	4	0	52	6
Portsmouth	2022–23	League One	44	1	3	0	2	0	4	0	53	1
Portsmouth	2023–24	League One	38	1	1	0	2	0	3	2	44	3
Portsmouth	Total		198	13	12	2	8	0	21	2	239	17
Rotherham United	2024–25	League One	9	1	0	0	1	0	1	0	11	1
Rotherham United	2025–26	League One	9	0	0	0	1	0	3	1	13	1
Rotherham United	Total		18	1	0	0	2	0	4	1	24	2
Cambridge United (loan)	2025–26	League Two	3	0	0	0	0	0	0	0	3	0
Career total			398	30	31	8	12	0	49	6	490	44

== Honours ==
Lincoln City

- National League: 2016–17

Portsmouth

- EFL League One: 2023–24
- EFL Trophy runner-up: 2019–20

Individual

- Portsmouth Player of the Season: 2021–22
