= Gavin Bazunu =

Irish footballer (born 2002)

- Bazunu in 2025

Personal information
- Full name: Gavin Okeroghene Bazunu
- Date of birth: 20 February 2002 (age 24)
- Place of birth: Dublin, Ireland
- Height: 1.89 m (6 ft 2 in)
- Position: Goalkeeper

Team information
- Current team: Bolton Wanderers
- Number: 31

Youth career
- –2018: Shamrock Rovers

Senior career*
Years	Team	Apps	(Gls)
2018	Shamrock Rovers	4	(0)
2019–2022	Manchester City	0	(0)
2020–2021	→ Rochdale (loan)	29	(0)
2021–2022	→ Portsmouth (loan)	44	(0)
2022–2026	Southampton	92	(0)
2025	→ Standard Liège (loan)	8	(0)
2026	→ Stoke City (loan)	6	(0)
2026–	Bolton Wanderers	8	(0)

International career^{‡}
2019	Republic of Ireland U17	2	(0)
2019	Republic of Ireland U21	3	(0)
2021–	Republic of Ireland	22	(0)
- * Club domestic league appearances and goals as of 09:14, 22 November 2026 (UTC) ‡ National team caps and goals as of 06:20, 27 March 2024 (UTC)

Gavin Okeroghene Bazunu (born 20 February 2002) is an Irish professional footballer who plays as a goalkeeper for EFL Championship club Bolton Wanderers and the Republic of Ireland national team.

Bazunu started his career at Shamrock Rovers, making his first team debut in June 2018 at the age of 16, before joining Manchester City in February 2019. He had loan spells at Rochdale and Portsmouth. In 2022, Bazunu permanently joined Southampton. He spent half of the 2024–25 season on loan at Standard Liège and half of the 2025–26 season on loan at Stoke City. He left Southampton in August 2026 and subsequently signed for Bolton Wanderers.

An Irish youth international, he made his senior international debut in 2021.

== Early and personal life ==
Born in Dublin, Bazunu was raised in Firhouse, a suburb of the city. He is of Irish and Nigerian descent, with his father being Nigerian. His younger brother, Todd, is also a goalkeeper and plays at youth level for Shamrock Rovers.

== Club career ==
=== Shamrock Rovers ===
Having come through the academy at Shamrock Rovers, Bazunu made his debut for Rovers' first team on 9 June 2018 in a 5–0 win at home to Bray Wanderers, at the age of 16. Manager Stephen Bradley stated that despite not wanting to 'throw [young goalkeepers] in that early', Bazunu was 'ready' for his first-team debut. He made three further appearances for Shamrock Rovers in the 2018 League of Ireland Premier Division. These included a penalty save at Cork City which meant he kept four clean sheets out of four in the league. Bazunu also made two appearances in the 2018–19 UEFA Europa League.

=== Manchester City ===
On 6 September 2018, it was announced that Bazunu had joined Premier League club Manchester City for an undisclosed fee reported to be £420,000, though a joining date had not been set, with Bazunu wishing to complete his education in the Irish education system. The following month, it was announced he has signed a pre-contract agreement with Manchester City, with it initially agreed he would join the club in summer 2019, before it was moved forward to February 2019. He made his debut for Manchester City's under-18 side on 9 February 2019 against Stoke City U18.

Bazunu was named in Manchester City's UEFA Champions League squad for a Round of 16 second leg match against Real Madrid in August 2020.

==== Loans to Rochdale and Portsmouth ====
He signed a contract extension with Manchester City until 2024 and joined League One side Rochdale on a season-long loan later that month. He started and kept a clean sheet on his debut for Rochdale on 5 September 2020 in a 1–0 EFL Cup victory away to Huddersfield Town, and made his first league appearance the following week in a 3–1 defeat at Swindon Town.

On 1 July 2021, he moved on loan to Portsmouth for the 2021–22 season. He was named as the club's Players' Player and Player of the Season.

=== Southampton ===
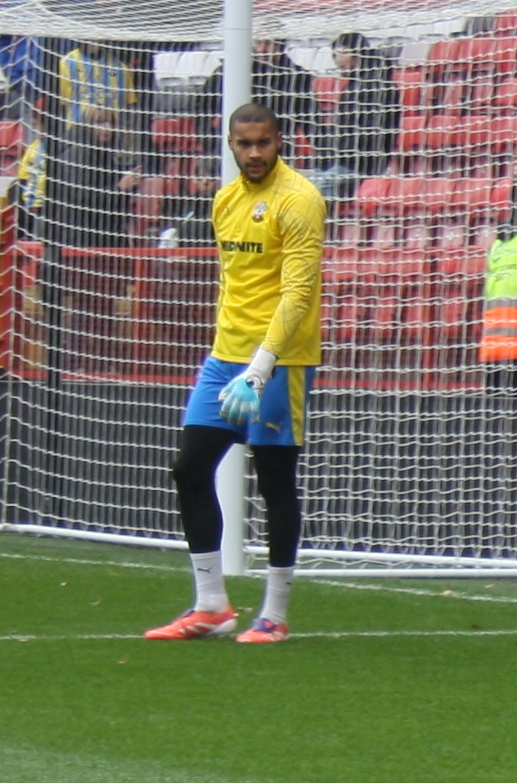
Bazunu with Southampton in 2025

On 17 June 2022, Bazunu joined Southampton on a five-year contract for a reported fee of £12 million. On 6 August 2022, he made his first Premier League appearance for Southampton in a 4–1 defeat to Tottenham Hotspur. Bazunu got his first clean sheet in the Premier League and for Southampton on 19 October 2022 in a 0–1 victory against Bournemouth.

Ahead of a match against Preston North End on 16 April 2024, he suffered an achilles injury during the warm-up. Manager Russell Martin subsequently confirmed that Bazunu would be sidelined for nine to ten months. On 10 January 2025, he played for the under-21 side in a 5–0 victory over Fulham in Premier League 2.

==== Standard Liège (loan) ====
On 3 February 2025, he joined Belgian Pro League club Standard Liège on loan for the remainder of the 2024–25 season. On 24 April 2025, it was announced that Bazunu's loan was cut short due to a knee injury and he would be returning to Southampton.

==== Stoke City (loan) ====
On 13 January 2026, Bazunu joined Stoke City on loan for the remainder of the 2025–26 season. Injuries restricted Bazunu to just six appearances for Stoke.

=== Bolton Wanderers ===
On 28 August 2026, Bazunu joined Bolton Wanderers on a three-year contract for an undisclosed fee.

He made his debut for Bolton on 8 September 2026 in a 3–2 defeat against West Ham United at the Toughsheet Community Stadium. West Ham's winner came from a Bazunu mistake. Four days later he kept a clean sheet in a Man of the match performance against Cardiff City, with Bolton winning 1–0.

== International career ==
Bazunu has played for the Republic of Ireland at under-17 and under-21 youth levels. He played for the under-17s at the 2019 UEFA European Under-17 Championship.

In March 2021, he was called into the senior Republic of Ireland team for the first time, for the 2022 FIFA World Cup qualifiers. He made his senior debut in a 1–0 defeat on 27 March 2021 against Luxembourg.

In September 2026, Bazunu withdrew from the Irish squad ahead of UEFA Nations League games against Israel in protest against the Gaza genocide. The rest of the squad voted by a majority to play the fixtures.

== Career statistics ==
=== Club ===
As of match played 21 November 2026

Appearances and goals by club, season and competition
Club	Season	League			National cup (Note: Includes FA Cup)		League cup (Note: Includes EFL Cup)		Other		Total	
Club	Season	Division	Apps	Goals	Apps	Goals	Apps	Goals	Apps	Goals	Apps	Goals
Shamrock Rovers	2018	League of Ireland Premier Division	4	0	0	0	0	0	2 (Note: Appearances in UEFA Europa League)	0	6	0
Manchester City	2018–19	Premier League	0	0	0	0	0	0	0	0	0	0
Manchester City	2019–20	Premier League	0	0	0	0	0	0	0	0	0	0
Manchester City	2020–21	Premier League	0	0	0	0	0	0	0	0	0	0
Manchester City	2021–22	Premier League	0	0	0	0	0	0	0	0	0	0
Manchester City	Total		0	0	0	0	0	0	0	0	0	0
Rochdale (loan)	2020–21	League One	29	0	1	0	2	0	0	0	32	0
Portsmouth (loan)	2021–22	League One	44	0	2	0	0	0	0	0	46	0
Southampton	2022–23	Premier League	32	0	1	0	4	0	—		37	0
Southampton	2023–24	Championship	41	0	0	0	0	0	0	0	41	0
Southampton	2024–25	Premier League	0	0	0	0	0	0	—		0	0
Southampton	2025–26	Championship	19	0	0	0	0	0	—		19	0
Southampton	Total		92	0	1	0	4	0	0	0	97	0
Standard Liège (loan)	2024–25	Belgian Pro League	8	0	—		—		—		8	0
Stoke City (loan)	2025–26	Championship	6	0	0	0	—		—		6	0
Bolton Wanderers	2026–27	Championship	8	0	0	0	0	0	—		8	0
Career total			191	0	4	0	6	0	2	0	203	0

=== International ===
As of match played 26 March 2024

Appearances and goals by national team and year
National team	Year	Apps	Goals
Republic of Ireland	2021	10	0
Republic of Ireland	2022	3	0
Republic of Ireland	2023	8	0
Republic of Ireland	2024	1	0
Total		22	0

== Honours ==
Individual

- Premier League Save of the Month: November / December 2022
- Portsmouth Player of the Season: 2021–22
- RTÉ Young Sportsperson of the Year: 2021
- FAI Young International Player of the Year: 2021
- PFA Team of the Year: 2021–22 League One
- IFFHS Men's World Youth (U20) Team: 2022
