= 2021–22 Portsmouth F.C. season =

Portsmouth
2021–22 season
- Owner-Chairman: Michael Eisner
- Chief Executive Officer: Andrew Cullen
- Manager: Danny Cowley
- Stadium: Fratton Park
- League One: 10th (73 points)
- FA Cup: Second Round
- EFL Cup: First round
- EFL Trophy: Third Round
- Top goalscorer: League: George Hirst (13); All: George Hirst (15)
- Highest home attendance: 17,418 vs. Sunderland (2 October 2021)
- Lowest home attendance: 11,470 vs. Crewe Alexandra (14 August 2021)
- Biggest win: 4–0 vs. Sunderland (H) (2 October 2021)
- Biggest defeat: 4–0 vs. Ipswich (H) (19 October 2021)
Home colours	Away colours	Third colours

The 2021–22 season was Portsmouth's fifth consecutive season in League One. Along with the league, the club also competed in the FA Cup, the EFL Cup and the EFL Trophy. The season covers the period from 1 July 2021 to 30 June 2022.

== Players ==
=== Squad ===
As of 05 May 2022

Note: Flags indicate national team as defined under FIFA eligibility rules; some limited exceptions apply. Players may hold more than one non-FIFA nationality.

No.	Pos.	Nation	Player
1	GK	IRL	Gavin Bazunu (on loan from Manchester City)
3	DF	ENG	Denver Hume
4	DF	SCO	Clark Robertson (captain)
6	MF	IRL	Shaun Williams
7	FW	IRL	Aiden O'Brien
8	MF	ENG	Ryan Tunnicliffe
9	FW	ENG	Tyler Walker (on loan from Coventry City)
10	FW	IRL	Marcus Harness
11	FW	IRL	Ronan Curtis
13	DF	WAL	Kieron Freeman
14	FW	ENG	Jayden Reid
15	DF	ANT	Mahlon Romeo (on loan from Millwall)

No.	Pos.	Nation	Player
16	DF	ENG	Connor Ogilvie
17	DF	ENG	Hayden Carter (on loan from Blackburn Rovers)
18	FW	LCA	Reeco Hackett
19	FW	SCO	George Hirst (on loan from Leicester City)
20	DF	ENG	Sean Raggett
21	MF	WAL	Joe Morrell
22	DF	ENG	Liam Vincent
23	MF	WAL	Louis Thompson
24	FW	ENG	Michael Jacobs
25	MF	ENG	Jay Mingi
28	GK	ENG	Ollie Webber

== Transfers ==
=== In ===
No.	Pos.	Player	Transferred From	Fee	Date	Source
4	DF	(Scotland) Clark Robertson	(England) Rotherham United	Free Transfer	1 July 2021	
6	MF	(Republic of Ireland) Shaun Williams	(England) Millwall	Free Transfer	1 July 2021	
8	MF	(England) Ryan Tunnicliffe	(England) Luton Town	Free Transfer	1 July 2021	
22	DF	(England) Liam Vincent	(England) Bromley	Undisclosed	1 July 2021	
13	DF	(Wales) Kieron Freeman	(Wales) Swansea City	Free Transfer	11 July 2021	
14	FW	(England) Jayden Reid	(England) Birmingham City	Free Transfer	20 July 2021	
16	DF	(England) Connor Ogilvie	(England) Gillingham	Free Transfer	2 August 2021	
21	MF	(Wales) Joe Morrell	(England) Luton Town	Undisclosed	9 August 2021	
23	MF	(Wales) Louis Thompson	(England) Norwich City	Free Transfer	10 August 2021	
25	MF	(England) Jay Mingi	(England) Charlton Athletic	Free Transfer	24 September 2021	
3	DF	(England) Denver Hume	(England) Sunderland	Undisclosed	26 January 2022	
28	GK	(England) Oliver Webber	(England) Crystal Palace	Undisclosed	26 January 2022	
7	FW	(Republic of Ireland) Aiden O'Brien	(England) Sunderland	Undisclosed	31 January 2022	

=== Out ===
No.	Pos.	Player	Transferred to	Fee	Date	Source
13	DF	(England) James Bolton	(England) Plymouth Argyle	Undisclosed	24 June 2021	
-	FW	(Northern Ireland) Harry Anderson	(Northern Ireland) Portadown	End of Contract	30 June 2021	
32	MF	(England) Charlie Bell	(England) Bognor Regis Town	End of Contract	30 June 2021	
33	MF	(England) Harrison Brook	(England) Bognor Regis Town	End of Contract	30 June 2021	
-	DF	(England) Tom Bruce	Unattached	End of Contract	30 June 2021	
14	MF	(England) Andy Cannon	(England) Hull City	End of Contract	30 June 2021	
8	MF	(England) Ben Close	(England) Doncaster Rovers	End of Contract	30 June 2021	
21	DF	(England) Charlie Daniels	(England) Colchester United	End of Contract	30 June 2021	
26	FW	(England) Jordy Hiwula	(England) Doncaster Rovers	End of Contract	30 June 2021	
38	DF	(England) Harry Kavanagh	(England) Gosport Borough	End of Contract	30 June 2021	
1	GK	(Scotland) Craig MacGillivray	(England) Charlton Athletic	End of Contract	30 June 2021	
17	MF	(England) Bryn Morris	(England) Burton Albion	End of Contract	30 June 2021	
4	MF	(England) Tom Naylor	(England) Wigan Athletic	End of Contract	30 June 2021	
-	GK	(England) Leon Pitman	(England) Horndean	End of Contract	30 June 2021	
39	MF	(Wales) Harvey Rew	(England) Gosport Borough	End of Contract	30 June 2021	
42	GK	(England) Taylor Seymour	(England) Burgess Hill Town	End of Contract	30 June 2021	
40	FW	(England) Alfie Stanley	(England) Dorchester Town	End of Contract	30 June 2021	
34	MF	(Northern Ireland) Gerard Storey	(Republic of Ireland) Derry City	End of Contract	30 June 2021	
31	FW	(South Korea) Lee Suk-jae	(England) Gosport Borough	End of Contract	30 June 2021	
36	FW	(Northern Ireland) Eoin Teggart	(Northern Ireland) Portadown	End of Contract	30 June 2021	
41	GK	(United States) Duncan Turnbull	Unattached	End of Contract	30 June 2021	
6	DF	(England) Jack Whatmough	(England) Wigan Athletic	End of Contract	30 June 2021	
7	FW	(India) Ryan Williams	(England) Oxford United	End of Contract	30 June 2021	
17	FW	(Wales) Ellis Harrison	(England) Fleetwood Town	Undisclosed	8 January 2022	
9	FW	(England) John Marquis	(England) Lincoln City	Undisclosed	18 January 2022	
3	DF	(England) Lee Brown	(England) AFC Wimbledon	Free Transfer	28 January 2022	

=== Loaned in ===
No.	Pos.	Player	Loaned From	Until	Date	Source
1	GK	(Republic of Ireland) Gavin Bazunu	(England) Manchester City	End of Season	1 July 2021	
7	FW	(Morocco) Gassan Ahadme	(England) Norwich City	13 January 2022 (Note: On 13 January, Ahadme was recalled early by his parent club Norwich.)	20 July 2021	
19	FW	(Scotland) George Hirst	(England) Leicester City	End of Season	3 August 2021	
27	MF	(England) Miguel Azeez	(England) Arsenal	17 January 2022 (Note: On 17 January, Azeez was recalled early by his parent club Arsenal.)	30 August 2021	
15	DF	(Antigua and Barbuda) Mahlon Romeo	(England) Millwall	End of Season	31 August 2021	
39	GK	(England) Jake Eastwood	(England) Sheffield United	14 September 2021	7 September 2021	
17	DF	(England) Hayden Carter	(England) Blackburn Rovers	End of Season	16 January 2022	
9	FW	(England) Tyler Walker	(England) Coventry City	End of Season	18 January 2022	

=== Loaned out ===
No.	Pos.	Player	Loaned to	Until	Date	Source
2	DF	(England) Callum Johnson	(England) Fleetwood Town	End of Season	27 August 2021	
5	DF	(Tanzania) Haji Mnoga	(England) Bromley	2 January 2022	31 August 2021	
25	MF	(England) Jay Mingi	(England) Maidenhead United	1 January 2022	5 October 2021	
-	MF	(England) Dan Gifford	(England) Bognor Regis Town	23 January 2022	23 December 2021	
-	DF	(England) Harvey Hughes	(England) Bognor Regis Town	23 January 2022	23 December 2021	
5	DF	(Tanzania) Haji Mnoga	(England) Weymouth	End of Season	8 January 2022	
26	DF	(England) Paul Downing	(England) Rochdale	End of Season	13 January 2022	
38	MF	(Wales) Harry Jewitt-White	(England) Havant & Waterlooville	End of Season	21 January 2022	
35	GK	(England) Alex Bass	(England) Bradford City	End of Season	24 January 2022	
-	DF	(England) Issiaga Kaba	(England) Salisbury	End of Season	28 January 2022	

== Pre-season friendlies ==
Pompey announced they would play friendly matches against Havant & Waterlooville, Crystal Palace, Bristol City, Gosport Borough, Luton Town, Bognor Regis Town, Peterborough United and Bournemouth U23s as part of their pre-season preparations.

7 July 2021 Friendly	Queens Park Rangers	2–1	Portsmouth	Heston
12:00 BST	Ramkilde 53'; Shodipo 63' (pen.)	Report	Marquis 26'	Stadium: Heston Training Complex; Attendance: 0 (Behind-closed-doors)

10 July 2021 Friendly	Havant & Waterlooville	2–5	Portsmouth	Havant
15:00 BST	Wright 11'; Roberts 31'	Report	Tunnicliffe 18'; Trialist 55', 56', 81'; Hackett-Fairchild 69'	Stadium: Draper Tools Community Stadium; Referee: Dean Treleavan

16 July 2021 Friendly	Portsmouth	P–P	Crystal Palace	Burton upon Trent
12:00 BST				Stadium: St George's Park National Football Centre; Attendance: 0 (Behind-closed-doors)
Note: Match was later cancelled.

20 July 2021 Friendly	Bristol City	3–3	Portsmouth	Failand
14:00 BST	Weimann 56'; Palmer 65'; Martin 77' (pen.)	Report	Ahadme 7', 45+4' (pen.); Francois 101'	Stadium: Robins High Performance Centre
Note: 120 minute match

21 July 2021 Friendly	Gosport Borough	P–P	Portsmouth XI	Gosport
19:30 BST				Stadium: Privett Park
Note: Match was scheduled due to duty of care with ongoing investigation.

24 July 2021 Friendly	Luton Town	1–1	Portsmouth	Luton
15:00 BST	Adebayo 10'	Report	Ahadme 12'	Stadium: Kenilworth Road; Referee: Keith Stroud

27 July 2021 Friendly	Chelsea U23s	2–0	Portsmouth XI	Stoke d'Abernon
19:00 BST	Mothersille 78', 81'	Report		Stadium: Cobham Training Centre; Attendance: 0 (Behind-closed-doors)

28 July 2021 Friendly	Bognor Regis Town	P–P	Portsmouth XI	Bognor Regis
19:30 BST				Stadium: Nyewood Lane
Note: Match was cancelled due to COVID-19 protocols.

31 July 2021 Friendly	Portsmouth	2–0	Peterborough United	Portsmouth
15:00 BST	Tunnicliffe 24'; Curtis 39'	Report		Stadium: Fratton Park; Attendance: 4,077; Referee: Andy Davies

3 August 2021 Friendly	Bournemouth U23s	0–1	Portsmouth XI	Kings Park
16:00 BST		Report	Hackett 20'	Stadium: Kings Park Training Complex; Attendance: 0 (Behind-closed-doors)

== Competitions ==
=== Overall record ===
Competition	Starting round	Final position	Record							
Competition	Starting round	Final position	Pld	W	D	L	GF	GA	GD	Win %
EFL League One	Matchday 1	10th	46	20	13	13	68	51	+17	43.48
FA Cup	First round	Second round	2	1	0	1	2	2	+0	50.00
EFL Cup	First round	First round	1	0	0	1	1	2	−1	0.00
EFL Trophy	Group stage	Third round	5	2	0	3	10	11	−1	40.00
Total			54	23	13	18	81	66	+15	42.59

Last updated: 4 July 2026
Source: Soccerway

=== League One ===
==== League table ====
Pos	Team	Pld	W	D	L	GF	GA	GD	Pts	Promotion, qualification or relegation
6	Wycombe Wanderers	46	23	14	9	75	51	+24	83	Qualification for League One play-offs
7	Plymouth Argyle	46	23	11	12	68	48	+20	80	
8	Oxford United	46	22	10	14	82	59	+23	76	
9	Bolton Wanderers	46	21	10	15	74	57	+17	73	
10	Portsmouth	46	20	13	13	68	51	+17	73	
11	Ipswich Town	46	18	16	12	67	46	+21	70	
12	Accrington Stanley	46	17	10	19	61	80	−19	61	
13	Charlton Athletic	46	17	8	21	55	59	−4	59	
14	Cambridge United	46	15	13	18	56	74	−18	58	

Source: EFL Official Website
Rules for classification: 1) Points; 2) Goal difference; 3) Number of goals scored; 4) Head-to-head results; 5) Wins; 6) Away goals; 7) Penalty points based on yellow and red cards received excluding the last four games of the season (sec 9.5); 8) 12-point sending off offences; 9) If the tie affects the automatic promotion or relegation places, a play-off game or games would be held between the two tied teams

==== Results summary ====
Overall								Home						Away					
Pld	W	D	L	GF	GA	GD	Pts	W	D	L	GF	GA	GD	W	D	L	GF	GA	GD
46	20	13	13	68	51	+17	73	14	5	4	46	25	+21	6	8	9	22	26	−4

Last updated: 30 April 2022.

==== Results by round ====
Matchday	1	2	3	4	5	6	7	8	9	10	11	12	13	14	15	16	17	18	19	20	21	22	23	24	25	26	27	28	29	30	31	32	33	34	35	36	37	38	39	40	41	42	43	44	45	46
Ground	A	H	H	A	A	A	H	H	A	A	H	A	H	A	H	H	A	H	A	A	H	H	A	H	A	A	H	A	H	H	A	H	H	H	A	A	A	H	A	A	H	H	A	H	H	A
Result	W	W	W	D	L	L	L	D	D	L	W	L	L	D	W	D	W	W	W	W	D	W	D	L	D	L	L	L	W	W	W	D	W	W	W	D	L	D	D	L	W	W	D	W	W	L
Position	6	2	1	3	5	11	15	12	10	13	11	12	17	16	13	14	10	9	9	9	9	8	8	9	9	10	11	13	11	11	11	11	10	10	10	10	10	10	10	11	10	9	9	9	9	10

Updated to match(es) played on 30 April 2022. Source: Statto.com
A = Away; H = Home; W = Win; D = Draw; L = Loss

==== Matches ====
Pompey's fixtures were announced on 24 June 2021.

7 August 2021 1	Fleetwood Town	0–1	Portsmouth	Fleetwood
15:00 BST		Report	Brown (yellow card) 24', (goal) 60'; Curtis (yellow card) 43'; Freeman (yellow card) 63'	Stadium: Highbury Stadium; Attendance: 4,562; Referee: Ben Speedie

14 August 2021 2	Portsmouth	2–0	Crewe Alexandra	Portsmouth
15:00 BST	Marquis 48'; Harness 64'	Report	Long (yellow card) 71'	Stadium: Fratton Park; Attendance: 11,470; Referee: Will Finnie

17 August 2021 3	Portsmouth	1–0	Shrewsbury Town	Portsmouth
19:45 BST	Tunnicliffe 3'; Curtis (yellow card) 20'	Report	Vela (yellow card) 54'	Stadium: Fratton Park; Attendance: 14,471; Referee: Trevor Kettle

21 August 2021 4	Doncaster Rovers	0–0	Portsmouth	Doncaster
15:00 BST	Bostock (yellow card) 65'; Knoyle (yellow card) 87'	Report	Marquis (yellow card) 72'; Williams (penalty missed) 77'; Jacobs (yellow card) 88'	Stadium: The Keepmoat Stadium; Attendance: 6,660; Referee: Carl Boyeson

28 August 2021 5	Wigan Athletic	1–0	Portsmouth	Wigan
15:00 BST	Lang 78'; Whatmough (yellow card) 92'	Report		Stadium: DW Stadium; Attendance: 9,571; Referee: Christopher Sarginson

11 September 2021 6	Milton Keynes Dons	1–0	Portsmouth	Denbigh
15:00 BST	Parrott (yellow card) 56'; Robson 72'; Fisher (yellow card) 79'	Report	Williams (yellow card) 90+2'	Stadium: Stadium MK; Attendance: 10,822; Referee: Marc Edwards

18 September 2021 7	Portsmouth	1–2	Cambridge United	Portsmouth
15:00 BST	Williams (yellow card) 48'; Curtis 76', (yellow card) 90+1'; Brown (yellow card) 87'	Report	Ironside 38'; O'Neil 69'; Tracey (yellow card) 78'; Digby (yellow card) 86'; Williams (yellow card) 87'	Stadium: Fratton Park; Attendance: 15,330; Referee: Gavin Ward

21 September 2021 8	Portsmouth	2–2	Plymouth Argyle	Portsmouth
19:45 BST	Brown 6'; Raggett (yellow card) 19', (goal) 90+5'; Curtis (yellow card) 24'; Harness (yellow card) 32'	Report	Grant (yellow card) 4'; Edwards (yellow card) 32'; Houghton (yellow card) 45+1'; Hardie 48', 80'	Stadium: Fratton Park; Attendance: 13,375; Referee: Carl Brook

25 September 2021 9	Charlton Athletic	2–2	Portsmouth	Charlton
15:00 BST	Clare 47', (yellow card) 75'; Souaré (yellow card) 68'; Davison 87'	Report	Curtis 6'; Brown (yellow card) 58'; Raggett (yellow card) 70'; Harness 72'	Stadium: The Valley; Attendance: 16,378; Referee: Antony Coggins

28 September 2021 10	Burton Albion	2–1	Portsmouth	Burton upon Trent
19:45 BST	O'Connor 32'; Smith (yellow card) 36'; Lakin (yellow card) 49'; Jebbison 60', (yellow card) 63'	Report	Hackett-Fairchild 64', (yellow card) 86'; Raggett (yellow card) 83'; Brown (yellow card) 85'; Harness (yellow card) 90+2'	Stadium: Pirelli Stadium; Attendance: 2,810; Referee: Tom Nield

2 October 2021 11	Portsmouth	4–0	Sunderland	Portsmouth
15:00 BST	Harness 19'; Brown 33'; Marquis 45', 61'	Report		Stadium: Fratton Park; Attendance: 17,418; Referee: Ben Toner

16 October 2021 12	Rotherham United	4–1	Portsmouth	Rotherham
15:00 BST	Smith 29', 55'; Ihiekwe (yellow card) 41'; Wood 60'; Wiles 62'; Rathbone (yellow card) 84'	Report	Harness 49'; Romeo (yellow card) 78'; Freeman (yellow card) 80'	Stadium: AESSEAL New York Stadium; Attendance: 9,684; Referee: Anthony Backhouse

19 October 2021 13	Portsmouth	0–4	Ipswich Town	Portsmouth
19:45 GMT	Curtis (yellow card) 13'; Harness (yellow card) 18'	Report	Edmundson (yellow card) 29'; Bonne 41'; Chaplin 54'; Aluko 58'; Morsy (yellow card) 72'; Burns 75'	Stadium: Fratton Park; Attendance: 16,301; Referee: Josh Smith

23 October 2021 14	Accrington Stanley	2–2	Portsmouth	Accrington
15:00 BST	Sykes (yellow card) 45+2'; Pell 50'; Hamilton (yellow card) 64'; Butcher 77'	Report	Curtis 18', (yellow card) 64'; Raggett (yellow card) 28'; Harness 86'	Stadium: Wham Stadium; Attendance: 2,889; Referee: Geoff Eltringham

30 October 2021 15	Portsmouth	1–0	Bolton Wanderers	Portsmouth
15:00 BST	Marquis 51'	Report		Stadium: Fratton Park; Attendance: 16,231; Referee: Craig Hicks

2 November 2021 16	Portsmouth	1–1	Cheltenham Town	Portsmouth
19:45 GMT	Hackett 32'; Williams (yellow card) 78'; Morrell (yellow card) 81'	Report	Freestone 6'; Hussey (yellow card) 49'; Crowley (yellow card) 89'	Stadium: Fratton Park; Attendance: 14,322; Referee: Robert Lewis

13 November 2021 17	Wycombe Wanderers	0–1	Portsmouth	High Wycombe
15:00 GMT	Obita (yellow card) 4'; Jacobson (penalty missed) 27', (yellow card) 45'; McCarthy (yellow card) 67'	Report	Harness 73'; Bass (yellow card) 81'	Stadium: Adams Park; Attendance: 6,471; Referee: Tom Nield

20 November 2021 18	Portsmouth	2–1	AFC Wimbledon	Portsmouth
15:00 GMT	Jacobs 63'; Harness 89'	Report	Palmer 24'	Stadium: Fratton Park; Attendance: 16,234; Referee: Thomas Bramall

23 November 2021 19	Lincoln City	0–3	Portsmouth	Lincoln
19:45 GMT	Montsma (yellow card) 60'; Maguire (yellow card) 84'	Report	Raggett (yellow card) 28'; Morrell (yellow card) 32'; Harness 45+3'; Hirst 66'; Hackett 89'	Stadium: LNER Stadium; Attendance: 8,533; Referee: Ross Joyce

27 November 2021 20	Gillingham	0–1	Portsmouth	Gillingham
15:00 GMT		Report	Romeo (yellow card) 82'; Jacobs 90+3'	Stadium: Priestfield Stadium; Attendance: 5,637; Referee: Dean Whitestone

7 December 2021 21	Portsmouth	0–0	Sheffield Wednesday	Portsmouth
19:45 GMT	Hackett (yellow card) 50'	Report	Peterson (yellow card) 4'; Luongo (red card) 69'	Stadium: Fratton Park; Attendance: 16,472; Referee: Sam Purkiss

11 December 2021 22	Portsmouth	2–0	Morecambe	Portsmouth
15:00 GMT	Harness 11'; Hackett (yellow card) 60'; Ogilvie 77'	Report	Gibson (yellow card) 38'; McLaughlin (yellow card) 85'; Delaney (yellow card) 95'	Stadium: Fratton Park; Attendance: 15,001; Referee: Charles Breakspear

3 January 2022 23	Cambridge United	0–0	Portsmouth	Cambridge
15:00 GMT	Smith (yellow card) 16' (yellow-red card) 60'; Brophy (yellow card) 38'; Iredale (yellow card) 89'	Report	Romeo (yellow card) 26'; Raggett (yellow card) 90+6'; Williams (yellow card) 90+8'	Stadium: Abbey Stadium; Referee: Joshua Smith

15 January 2022 24	Portsmouth	1–2	Milton Keynes Dons	Portsmouth
15:00 GMT	Hirst (yellow card) 31' (goal) 60'; Marquis (yellow card) 90+7'	Report	Eisa 20'; Corbeanu 45'; Robson (yellow card) 52'	Stadium: Fratton Park; Attendance: 14,958; Referee: Scott Oldham

18 January 2022 25	AFC Wimbledon	0–0	Portsmouth	Wimbledon
19:45 GMT	Woodyard (yellow card) 25'; McCormick (yellow card) 90+3'	Report	Harness (yellow card) 19'; Romeo (yellow card) 50'	Stadium: Plough Lane; Referee: James Oldham

22 January 2022 26	Sunderland	1–0	Portsmouth	Sunderland
15:00 GMT	Embleton 40'; Flanagan (yellow card) 54'	Report	Romeo (yellow card) 72'; Williams (yellow card) 75'	Stadium: Stadium of Light; Attendance: 32,220; Referee: David Rock

31 January 2022 27	Portsmouth	1–2	Charlton Athletic	Portsmouth
19:45 GMT	Jacobs 79'; Morrell (yellow card) 90'	Report	Washington 31'; Robertson 64' (o.g.); Famewo (yellow card) 78'; Aneke (yellow card) 85'; Leko (yellow card) 89'; Dobson (yellow card) 89'	Stadium: Fratton Park; Attendance: 15,326; Referee: Neil Hair

5 February 2022 28	Oxford United	3–2	Portsmouth	Oxford
15:00 GMT	McNally 6'; Brannagan (yellow card) 64', (goal) 82'; Seddon (yellow card) 77'; Kane (yellow card) 80'; Moore (yellow card) 90+4'; Holland 90+6'	Report	Jacobs 10', (yellow card) 24'; Morrell (red card) 16'; Hirst (yellow card) 28'; Hume (yellow card) 45+4'; Curtis 51', (yellow card) 81'; Bazunu (yellow card) 88'; Tunnicliffe (yellow card) 90+2'; Raggett (yellow card) 90+11'	Stadium: Kassam Stadium; Attendance: 10,373; Referee: Sam Barrott

8 February 2022 29	Portsmouth	2–1	Burton Albion	Portsmouth
19:45 GMT	Raggett (yellow card) 5', (goal) 33'; Curtis (yellow card) 34'; Jacobs 41'	Report	Mancienne (yellow card) 18'; Powell (yellow card) 29'; Taylor (yellow card) 47'; Ahadme 50'; Chapman (yellow card) 90+6'	Stadium: Fratton Park; Attendance: 13,407; Referee: Craig Hicks

12 February 2022 30	Portsmouth	4–0	Doncaster Rovers	Portsmouth
15:00 GMT	Hackett-Fairchild 56'; Hirst 63'; Thompson (yellow card) 66'; O'Brien 81'; Raggett 90+5'	Report		Stadium: Fratton Park; Attendance: 14,767; Referee: Tom Reeves

22 February 2022 31	Shrewsbury Town	1–2	Portsmouth	Shrewsbury
19:45 GMT	Leahy 14'; Vela (red card) 31'	Report	Hume 29'; Thompson (yellow card) 69', (goal) 84'	Stadium: Montgomery Waters Meadow; Attendance: 5,862; Referee: Seb Stockbridge

26 February 2022 32	Portsmouth	3–3	Fleetwood Town	Portsmouth
15:00 GMT	Curtis 45' (pen.), (yellow card) 50'; Harness 80'; O'Brien 90+5'	Report	Pilkington 7'; Biggins 15'; Lane 41', (yellow card) 57'; Cairns (yellow card) 73'; Harrison (yellow card) 82'	Stadium: Fratton Park; Attendance: 15,224; Referee: Alan Young

1 March 2022 33	Portsmouth	3–2	Oxford United	Portsmouth
19:45 GMT	Raggett 42'; Hirst 45+2'; Carter 58', (yellow card) 74'	Report	Browne 3'; McNally 81'; Long (yellow card) 86'	Stadium: Fratton Park; Attendance: 15,113; Referee: Sam Allison

5 March 2022 34	Portsmouth	4–0	Accrington Stanley	Portsmouth
15:00 GMT	Robertson (yellow card) 2'; Hirst 16', 56'; Harness (red card) 21'; Raggett 28'; Romeo (yellow card) 38'; Tunnicliffe 69'	Report	Pell (yellow card) 47'	Stadium: Fratton Park; Attendance: 15,051; Referee: Carl Brook

8 March 2022 35	Crewe Alexandra	1–3	Portsmouth	Crewe
19:45 GMT	Porter (yellow card) 55'; Long 90+1'	Report	Hirst 3', 66'; Thompson (yellow card) 27'; Walker 31'; Robertson (yellow card) 62'	Stadium: Mornflake Stadium; Attendance: 4,307; Referee: Andrew Kitchen

12 March 2022 36	Ipswich Town	0–0	Portsmouth	Ipswich
15:00 GMT	Thompson (yellow card) 77'; Donacien (yellow card) 82'	Report	Thompson (yellow card) 29'; Curtis (yellow card) 77'	Stadium: Portman Road; Attendance: 25,500; Referee: Christopher Sarginson

15 March 2022 37	Plymouth Argyle	1–0	Portsmouth	Plymouth
19:45 GMT	Sessegnon (yellow card) 43'; Hardie 65'; Cooper (yellow card) 90+5'	Report	Romeo (yellow card) 33'; Thompson (yellow card) 34'	Stadium: Home Park; Attendance: 15,604; Referee: Sam Purkiss

19 March 2022 38	Portsmouth	0–0	Wycombe Wanderers	Portsmouth
15:00 GMT	Raggett (yellow card) 77'; Carter (yellow card) 90+2'; Robertson (yellow card) 90+3'	Report	Stewart (yellow card) 37'	Stadium: Fratton Park; Attendance: 15,092; Referee: Ben Speedie

5 April 2022 39	Bolton Wanderers	1–1	Portsmouth	Horwich
20:00 BST	Dempsey (yellow card) 38'; Aimson (yellow card) 49'; Sadlier 77' (pen.)	Report	O'Brien 50'	Stadium: University of Bolton Stadium; Attendance: 13,809; Referee: Marc Edwards

9 April 2022 40	Cheltenham Town	1–0	Portsmouth	Cheltenham
15:00 BST	Sercombe 76'; Lloyd (yellow card) 82'	Report		Stadium: The Jonny Rocks Stadium; Attendance: 5,117; Referee: Ollie Yates

12 April 2022 41	Portsmouth	3–0	Rotherham United	Portsmouth
19:45 BST	Robertson (yellow card) 5', (goal) 35'; Jacobs (yellow card) 45+3'; Harness 59'; Hirst 65'	Report	Lindsay (yellow card) 9'; Barlaser (yellow card) 16'; Mattock (yellow card) 56'	Stadium: Fratton Park; Attendance: 14,154; Referee: David Rock

15 April 2022 42	Portsmouth	3–2	Lincoln City	Portsmouth
15:00 BST	Thompson (yellow card) 33'; Hirst 50'; Jacobs 68'; Curtis 82'	Report	Jackson (yellow card) 68'; Bishop 70'; House 78'	Stadium: Fratton Park; Attendance: 15,175; Referee: Trevor Kettle

18 April 2022 43	Morecambe	1–1	Portsmouth	Morecambe
15:00 BST	Ayunga 90+3'; Leigh (yellow card) 90+5'	Report	Raggett 41'	Stadium: The Mazuma Stadium; Attendance: 4,893; Referee: Bobby Madley

23 April 2022 44	Portsmouth	3–1	Gillingham	Portsmouth
15:00 BST	Curtis 4', 45+2'; Robertson 54'	Report	Tutonda (yellow card) 22'; Jackson 30'; Ehmer (yellow card) 90+3'	Stadium: Fratton Park; Attendance: 15,540; Referee: Darren Drysdale

26 April 2022 45	Portsmouth	3–2	Wigan Athletic	Portsmouth
19:45 BST	Hirst 62', 64'; Curtis (yellow card) 64'; O'Brien 87'	Report	Lang 38'; Darikwa (yellow card) 42'; Keane 45+3'; Amos (yellow card) 63'	Stadium: Fratton Park; Attendance: 14,637; Referee: Craig Hicks

30 April 2022 46	Sheffield Wednesday	4–1	Portsmouth	Owlerton
12:30 BST	Gregory 17', (yellow card) 74'; Berahino 36'; Storey 40'; Paterson (yellow card) 85'; Byers 86', (yellow card) 90'	Report	Hirst 4'; Morrell (yellow card) 90'	Stadium: Hillsborough Stadium; Attendance: 33,394; Referee: Anthony Backhouse

=== FA Cup ===
Portsmouth were drawn at home against Harrow Borough in the first round and to Harrogate Town in the second round.

6 November 2021 First round	Portsmouth	1–0	Harrow Borough	Portsmouth
15:00 GMT	Harness 28'	Report	Adenola (yellow card) 45+1'; Uche (yellow card) 90+5'	Stadium: Fratton Park; Attendance: 6,869; Referee: Scott Tallis

4 December 2021 Second round	Portsmouth	1–2	Harrogate Town	Portsmouth
15:00 GMT	Harrison 45+1'	Report	Armstrong 44'; Diamond 90+4'	Stadium: Fratton Park; Attendance: 7,857; Referee: Simon Mather

=== EFL Cup ===
Portsmouth were drawn away to Millwall in the first round.

10 August 2021 First round	Millwall	2–1	Portsmouth	Bermondsey
19:45 BST	Malone 21'; Saville 27'; Cooper (yellow card) 49'	Report	Hackett-Fairchild 4', (yellow card) 49'; Johnson (red card) 48'	Stadium: The Den; Attendance: 7,915; Referee: Charles Breakspear

=== EFL Trophy ===
Pompey were drawn into Southern Group B alongside AFC Wimbledon, Crystal Palace U21s and Sutton United. The group stage fixtures were confirmed on the 23rd of August. In the knock-out stages, Portsmouth were drawn away to Cambridge United.

Pos	Div	Team	Pld	W	PW	PL	L	GF	GA	GD	Pts	Qualification
1	L2	Sutton United	3	3	0	0	0	6	0	+6	9	Advance to Round 2
2	L1	Portsmouth	3	1	0	0	2	6	7	−1	3	Advance to Round 2
3	L1	AFC Wimbledon	3	1	0	0	2	5	6	−1	3	
4	ACA	Crystal Palace U21	3	1	0	0	2	2	6	−4	3	

Source: EFL.com

7 September 2021 Group game 1	AFC Wimbledon	5–3	Portsmouth	Wimbledon
19:45 BST	Kalambayi 2'; Pressley 43', 80' (pen.); Lawrence (yellow card) 72'; Nightingale 87'; McCormick 90+4'	Report	Mnoga (yellow card) 2'; Harrison 45+4', 52', 78'	Stadium: Plough Lane; Attendance: 3,560; Referee: Darren Drysdale

12 October 2021 Group game 2	Portsmouth	0–2	Sutton United	Portsmouth
19:45 BST	Jacobs (yellow card) 86'	Report	Olaofe 55'; John 71'; Eastmond (yellow card) 83'	Stadium: Fratton Park; Attendance: 2,490; Referee: Lee Swabey

16 November 2021 Group game 3	Portsmouth	3–0	Crystal Palace U21	Portsmouth
19:45 BST	Azeez 32'; Ahadme 54'; Hirst 90+3'	Report		Stadium: Fratton Park; Attendance: 1,660

7 January 2022 Second round	Exeter City	2–3	Portsmouth	Exeter
19:30 BST	Jay 6'; Collins 76'	Report	Hirst 5'; Morrell (yellow card) 35'; Raggett (yellow card) 64'; Curtis 89', 90+3', (yellow card) 90+4'	Stadium: St James Park; Attendance: 2,146

11 January 2022 Third round	Cambridge United	2–1	Portsmouth	Cambridge
19:00 GMT	Lankester (yellow card) 23'; Knibbs 50', 59'; Iredale (yellow card) 54'	Report	Jacobs 76'	Stadium: Abbey Stadium; Attendance: 1,308; Referee: Ben Toner

== Statistics ==
=== Appearances and goals ===
As of match(es) played 30 April 2022

Players with no appearances are not included on the list
Italics indicate a loaned in player

No.	Pos	Nat	Player	Total		League One		FA Cup		EFL Cup		EFL Trophy	
No.	Pos	Nat	Player	Apps	Goals	Apps	Goals	Apps	Goals	Apps	Goals	Apps	Goals
1	GK	(Republic of Ireland) IRL	Gavin Bazunu	46	0	44+0	0	2+0	0	0+0	0	0+0	0
2	DF	(England) ENG	Callum Johnson	2	0	0+1	0	0+0	0	1+0	0	0+0	0
3	DF	(England) ENG	Denver Hume	9	1	7+2	1	0+0	0	0+0	0	0+0	0
4	DF	(Scotland) SCO	Clark Robertson	28	2	22+4	2	0+0	0	1+0	0	1+0	0
5	DF	(Tanzania) TAN	Haji Mnoga	2	0	0+0	0	0+0	0	0+0	0	2+0	0
6	MF	(Republic of Ireland) IRL	Shaun Williams	35	0	24+7	0	2+0	0	1+0	0	0+1	0
7	FW	(Republic of Ireland) IRL	Aiden O'Brien	17	4	8+9	4	0+0	0	0+0	0	0+0	0
8	MF	(England) ENG	Ryan Tunnicliffe	32	2	21+9	2	0+0	0	1+0	0	0+1	0
9	FW	(England) ENG	Tyler Walker	15	1	9+6	1	0+0	0	0+0	0	0+0	0
10	FW	(Republic of Ireland) IRL	Marcus Harness	44	12	39+1	11	2+0	1	0+0	0	1+1	0
11	FW	(Republic of Ireland) IRL	Ronan Curtis	48	10	37+6	8	1+1	0	1+0	0	1+1	2
13	DF	(Wales) WAL	Kieron Freeman	25	0	19+0	0	1+0	0	0+1	0	3+1	0
15	DF	(Antigua and Barbuda) ATG	Mahlon Romeo	41	0	30+5	0	2+0	0	0+0	0	4+0	0
16	DF	(England) ENG	Connor Ogilvie	41	1	31+3	1	2+0	0	1+0	0	4+0	0
17	DF	(England) ENG	Hayden Carter	22	1	22+0	1	0+0	0	0+0	0	0+0	0
18	FW	(Saint Lucia) LCA	Reeco Hackett	34	5	16+11	4	1+1	0	1+0	1	3+1	0
19	FW	(Scotland) SCO	George Hirst	46	15	27+13	13	0+0	0	0+1	0	5+0	2
20	DF	(England) ENG	Sean Raggett	52	6	45+0	6	2+0	0	1+0	0	3+1	0
21	MF	(Wales) WAL	Joe Morrell	39	0	29+7	0	1+0	0	0+0	0	2+0	0
23	MF	(Wales) WAL	Louis Thompson	38	1	22+10	1	0+1	0	0+0	0	4+1	0
24	FW	(England) ENG	Michael Jacobs	32	6	11+13	5	1+1	0	0+1	0	4+1	1
25	MF	(England) ENG	Jay Mingi	3	0	0+3	0	0+0	0	0+0	0	0+0	0
26	DF	(England) ENG	Paul Downing	4	0	1+1	0	0+0	0	0+0	0	2+0	0
32	FW	(England) ENG	Adam Payce	1	0	0+0	0	0+0	0	0+0	0	1+0	0
33	FW	(Malta) MLT	Alfie Bridgman	1	0	0+0	0	0+0	0	0+0	0	0+1	0
34	DF	(England) ENG	Issiaga Kaba	1	0	0+0	0	0+0	0	0+0	0	0+1	0
35	GK	(England) ENG	Alex Bass	7	0	2+0	0	0+0	0	1+0	0	4+0	0
38	MF	(Wales) WAL	Harry Jewitt-White	3	0	0+0	0	0+0	0	0+0	0	0+3	0
41	DF	(England) ENG	Harvey Hughes	1	0	0+0	0	0+0	0	0+0	0	1+0	0
Player(s) who featured whilst on loan but returned to parent club during the season:
7	FW	(Morocco) MAR	Gassan Ahadme	10	1	2+3	0	0+1	0	1+0	0	3+0	1
27	MF	(England) ENG	Miguel Azeez	10	1	4+2	0	2+0	0	0+0	0	2+0	1
39	GK	(England) ENG	Jake Eastwood	1	0	0+0	0	0+0	0	0+0	0	1+0	0
Player(s) who featured but departed permanently during the season:
3	DF	(England) ENG	Lee Brown	24	3	18+1	3	1+1	0	0+0	0	2+1	0
9	FW	(England) ENG	John Marquis	24	4	15+4	4	1+1	0	1+0	0	1+1	0
17	FW	(Wales) WAL	Ellis Harrison	14	4	1+10	0	1+0	1	0+0	0	1+1	3

=== Disciplinary record ===
As of match(es) played 30 April 2022

Players with no cards are not included on the list
Italics indicate a loaned in player

No.	Pos	Nat	Player	Total		League One		FA Cup		EFL Cup		EFL Trophy	
No.	Pos	Nat	Player	Yellow card	Red card	Yellow card	Red card	Yellow card	Red card	Yellow card	Red card	Yellow card	Red card
1	GK	(Republic of Ireland) IRL	Gavin Bazunu	1	0	1	0	0	0	0	0	0	0
2	DF	(England) ENG	Callum Johnson	0	1	0	0	0	0	0	1	0	0
3	DF	(England) ENG	Denver Hume	1	0	1	0	0	0	0	0	0	0
4	DF	(Scotland) SCO	Clark Robertson	4	0	4	0	0	0	0	0	0	0
5	DF	(Tanzania) TAN	Haji Mnoga	1	0	0	0	0	0	0	0	1	0
6	MF	(Republic of Ireland) IRL	Shaun Williams	6	0	5	0	1	0	0	0	0	0
8	MF	(England) ENG	Ryan Tunnicliffe	2	0	2	0	0	0	0	0	0	0
10	FW	(Republic of Ireland) IRL	Marcus Harness	4	1	4	1	0	0	0	0	0	0
11	FW	(Republic of Ireland) IRL	Ronan Curtis	13	0	12	0	0	0	0	0	1	0
13	DF	(Wales) WAL	Kieron Freeman	2	0	2	0	0	0	0	0	0	0
15	DF	(Antigua and Barbuda) ATG	Mahlon Romeo	7	0	7	0	0	0	0	0	0	0
16	DF	(England) ENG	Connor Ogilvie	1	0	0	0	1	0	0	0	0	0
17	DF	(England) ENG	Hayden Carter	2	0	2	0	0	0	0	0	0	0
18	FW	(Saint Lucia) LCA	Reeco Hackett	4	0	3	0	0	0	1	0	0	0
19	FW	(Scotland) SCO	George Hirst	2	0	2	0	0	0	0	0	0	0
20	DF	(England) ENG	Sean Raggett	10	0	9	0	0	0	0	0	1	0
21	MF	(Wales) WAL	Joe Morrell	5	1	4	1	0	0	0	0	1	0
23	MF	(Wales) WAL	Louis Thompson	38	1	6	0	0	0	0	0	0	0
24	FW	(England) ENG	Michael Jacobs	4	0	3	0	0	0	0	0	1	0
35	GK	(England) ENG	Alex Bass	1	0	1	0	0	0	0	0	0	0
Player(s) who featured whilst on loan but returned to parent club during the season:
27	MF	(England) ENG	Miguel Azeez	1	0	0	0	1	0	0	0	0	0
Player(s) who featured but departed permanently during the season:
3	DF	(England) ENG	Lee Brown	5	0	5	0	0	0	0	0	0	0
9	FW	(England) ENG	John Marquis	2	0	2	0	0	0	0	0	0	0
Squad Total				84	3	75	2	3	0	1	1	5	0
