= Ollie Webber =

Footballer (born 2000)

Personal information
- Date of birth: 26 June 2000 (age 26)
- Place of birth: Portsmouth, England
- Height: 1.89 m (6 ft 2 in)
- Position: Goalkeeper

Youth career
- Ards Rangers
- Glentoran
- 2016–2018: Crystal Palace

Senior career*
Years	Team	Apps	(Gls)
2018–2022	Crystal Palace	0	(0)
2018	→ Whyteleafe (loan)	2	(0)
2019	→ Greenwich Borough (loan)	15	(0)
2021	→ Dover Athletic (loan)	3	(0)
2022	Portsmouth	0	(0)
2022–2024	Glentoran	7	(0)
2024–2025	Woking	3	(0)
2025	Slough Town	1	(0)

International career
- Northern Ireland U17
- Northern Ireland U19
- Northern Ireland U21
- * Club domestic league appearances and goals as of 12:35, 8 October 2025 (UTC)

Oliver Webber (born 26 June 2000) is a professional footballer who last played as a goalkeeper for National League South club Slough Town. Born in England, he represented Northern Ireland at youth international level.

== Club career ==
Born in Portsmouth, Webber spent his early career with Northern Irish clubs Ards Rangers and Glentoran. He joined Crystal Palace in 2016. Webber also spent time on loan at Isthmian League sides Whyteleafe and Greenwich Borough during the 2018–19 campaign. He turned professional with Palace in May 2019, extending the contract in July 2020.

After a loan spell with Dover Athletic in January 2021, he signed for Portsmouth in January 2022.

He returned to Glentoran in July 2022. Webber was described as a "hero" after saving two penalties in the County Antrim Shield in September 2023, and first choice goalkeeper Aaron McCarey said that Webber deserved his chance in the first-team.

On 7 May 2024, it was announced that Webber would be one of ten players departing Glentoran upon the expiry of their contracts.

On 14 August 2024, having impressed with the club on trial, Webber signed for National League side Woking. On 6 May 2025, it was announced that Webber would leave the club upon the expiry of his contract in June. He departed having made 3 appearances.

On 4 October 2025, Webber joined National League South club Slough Town on a short-term deal.

== International career ==
Webber is a Northern Ireland under-21 youth international, having previously played at under-17 and under-19 levels.

== Career statistics ==
As of match played 11 October 2025

Appearances and goals by club, season and competition
Club	Season	League			National Cup		League Cup		Other		Total	
Club	Season	Division	Apps	Goals	Apps	Goals	Apps	Goals	Apps	Goals	Apps	Goals
Crystal Palace	2018–19	Premier League	0	0	0	0	0	0	—		0	0
Crystal Palace	2019–20	Premier League	0	0	0	0	0	0	—		0	0
Crystal Palace	2020–21	Premier League	0	0	0	0	0	0	—		0	0
Crystal Palace	2021–22	Premier League	0	0	0	0	0	0	—		0	0
Crystal Palace	Total		0	0	0	0	0	0	—		0	0
Whyteleafe (loan)	2018–19	Isthmian League South East Division	2	0	—		—		1 (Note: Appearance in the Alan Turvey Trophy)	0	3	0
Greenwich Borough (loan)	2018–19	Isthmian League South East Division	15	0	—		—		—		15	0
Dover Athletic (loan)	2020–21	National League	3	0	—		—		—		3	0
Portsmouth	2021–22	League One	0	0	—		—		—		0	0
Glentoran	2022–23	NIFL Premiership	2	0	0	0	1	0	—		3	0
Glentoran	2023–24	NIFL Premiership	5	0	1	0	0	0	0	0	6	0
Glentoran	Total		7	0	1	0	1	0	0	0	9	0
Woking	2024–25	National League	3	0	0	0	—		3 (Note: Appearance(s) in National League Cup)	0	6	0
Slough Town	2025–26	National League South	1	0	1	0	—		0	0	2	0
Career total			31	0	2	0	1	0	4	0	38	0
