= George Hirst (footballer) =

Scottish footballer (born 1999)

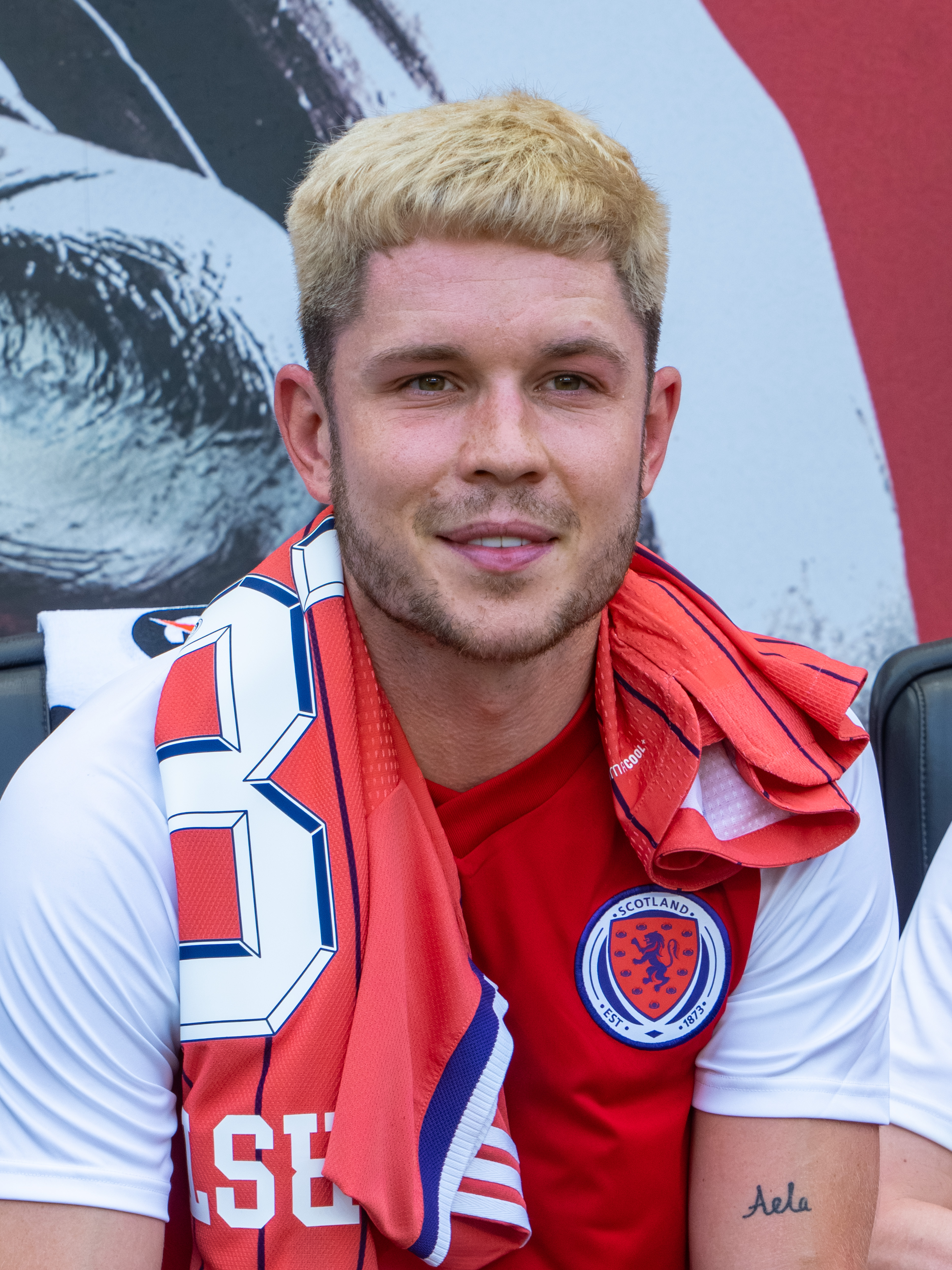
- Hirst with Scotland in 2026

Personal information
- Full name: George David Eric Hirst
- Date of birth: 15 February 1999 (age 27)
- Place of birth: Sheffield, South Yorkshire, England
- Height: 6 ft 3 in (1.91 m)
- Position: Forward

Team information
- Current team: Stoke City
- Number: 15

Youth career
- 2012–2016: Sheffield Wednesday

Senior career*
Years	Team	Apps	(Gls)
2016–2018	Sheffield Wednesday	1	(0)
2018–2019	OH Leuven	22	(3)
2019–2023	Leicester City	2	(0)
2020–2021	→ Rotherham United (loan)	31	(0)
2021–2022	→ Portsmouth (loan)	40	(13)
2022–2023	→ Blackburn Rovers (loan)	9	(0)
2023	→ Ipswich Town (loan)	21	(6)
2023–2026	Ipswich Town	94	(21)
2026–	Stoke City	15	(2)

International career^{‡}
2016	England U17	7	(3)
2016–2017	England U18	9	(4)
2017–2018	England U19	11	(3)
2017–2019	England U20	13	(7)
2025–	Scotland	10	(1)
- * Club domestic league appearances and goals as of 20:35, 21 November 2026 (UTC) ‡ National team caps and goals as of 23:05, 7 June 2026 (UTC)

George David Eric Hirst (born 15 February 1999) is a professional footballer who plays as a forward for EFL Championship club Stoke City. Born in England, he plays for the Scotland national team.

Hirst began his career with hometown club Sheffield Wednesday before a contract dispute saw him join Leicester City via OH Leuven in 2019. After a barren loan at Rotherham United, he had success with Portsmouth in 2021–22 before another goalless loan spell, this time at Blackburn Rovers. He joined Ipswich Town in January 2023 and helped them to promotion to the Premier League twice, in 2023–24 and 2025–26. In August 2026, he joined Stoke City.

== Club career ==
=== Early life ===
Hirst was born in Sheffield and is the son of former Sheffield Wednesday striker David Hirst. He attended Notre Dame High School whilst playing in Sheffield Wednesday's academy where he began at under-12 level.

=== Sheffield Wednesday ===
After coming through the academy, Hirst signed his first professional contract for Sheffield Wednesday in March 2016. He made his first-team debut against Cambridge United on 9 August 2016, in the EFL Cup in a 2–1 defeat. His league debut came on 10 December 2016 in a 2–1 defeat against Reading. In April 2018, Hirst was linked with a move to Manchester United after rejecting a long-term contract at Wednesday. Hirst fell out with the club's hierarchy over a new contract which led to him being 'frozen out' by the club in 2017–18.

=== OH Leuven ===
In June 2018, Hirst was signed by Belgian Challenger Pro League team OH Leuven, led by former Sheffield Wednesday player Nigel Pearson. Since Leuven are owned by the same King Power ownership group as Leicester City, the transfer acted as a financial bridge to bring him back to England. In the 2018–19 season, Hirst scored three goals in 22 appearances.

=== Leicester City ===
After one season at OH Leuven, Hirst joined Premier League club Leicester City in the summer of 2019, linking up with their under-21 squad. On 19 July 2020, Hirst made his debut for Leicester, coming on in the 83rd minute in a 3–0 loss to Tottenham Hotspur, and also played against Manchester United in the final match of the 2019–20 season.

On 16 September 2020, Hirst joined Rotherham United on loan for the 2020–21 season. At the New York Stadium, Hirst played back-up to forwards Freddie Ladapo and Michael Smith in a struggling Rotherham team who went on to be relegated. Hirst failed to score in 32 appearances for the Millers, of which only four were starts. On 3 August 2021, Hirst joined League One side Portsmouth on loan for the 2021–22 season. Under the management of Danny Cowley, Hirst was able to regain his confidence in front of goal, scoring 15 times in 46 appearances. Portsmouth tried to sign Hirst on a permanent basis but were unable to meet Leicester's asking price.

On 31 August 2022, Hirst joined Blackburn Rovers on a season-long loan, with an option to buy. His loan at Ewood Park was unsuccessful and, after failing to score in 11 appearances, he was recalled by Leicester in January 2023.

=== Ipswich Town ===
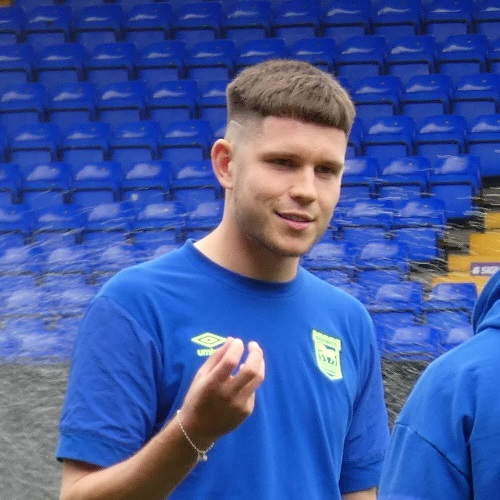
Hirst with Ipswich Town in 2023

On 8 January 2023, Hirst joined Ipswich Town on loan for the rest of the season. On 13 July 2023, Hirst made his move to Ipswich Town permanent for an undisclosed fee, signing a four-year deal with the club. He scored his first-ever Championship goal on his second debut for the club, netting against Sunderland on the opening day of the 2023–24 season.

Whilst playing against his former club, Leicester City, on 26 December 2023, he suffered a "significant" hamstring injury which would put him out for a majority of the rest of the season. He returned for the final three games of the season, beginning with the 3–3 draw against Hull City on 27 April, starting the match and scoring the first goal of the game. He then started on the bench in the following game against Coventry City, before starting the final game of the season, a 2–0 victory over Huddersfield Town where Ipswich were promoted to the Premier League.

He scored his first Premier League goal for Ipswich on 26 October 2024, his first game in the starting line-up, in which the Tractor Boys went on to lose 4–3 at Brentford, having been two goals up in the first half. Hirst scored three Premier League goals in 26 appearances as Ipswich were relegated back to the Championship with four matches remaining. On 4 July 2025, he extended his contract with the club until 2029. Hirst played a key role in 2025–26, scoring 11 times as Ipswich made an instant return to the Premier League, finishing in second place.

=== Stoke City ===
On 20 August 2026, Hirst joined Championship club Stoke City for an undisclosed fee on a three-year contract.

== International career ==
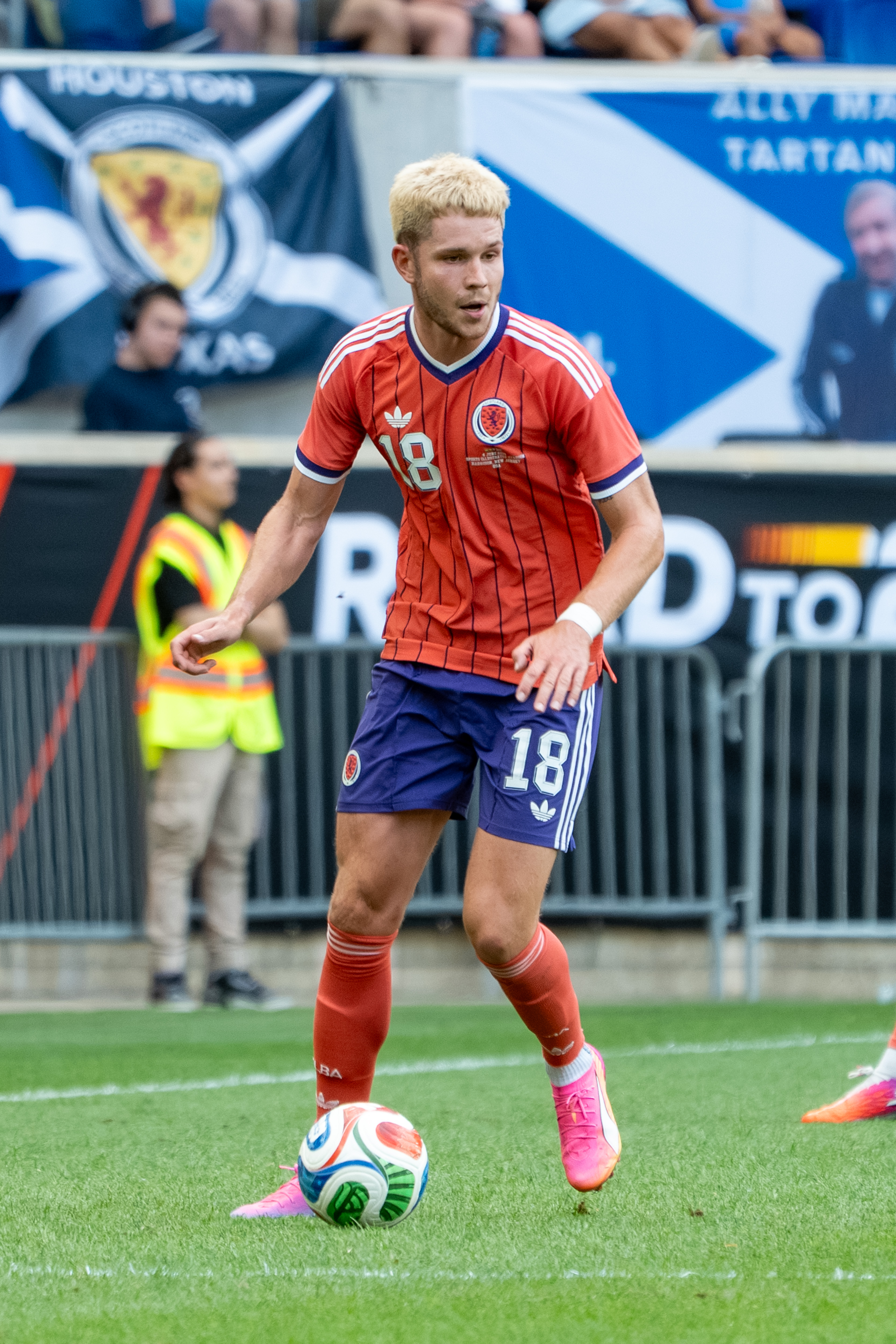
Hirst with Scotland in 2026

Hirst was eligible to represent England as his birthplace and Scotland via his paternal grandfather.

=== England youth ===
Hirst made his debut for the England Under-17 national team during the Algarve Cup in February 2016 – in his second game for the team he scored twice against Germany in a 2–2 draw. He was subsequently called up to the squad for the 2016 UEFA European Under-17 Championship in Azerbaijan. In the group stage Hirst scored against Denmark and started the Quarter-final defeat against Spain.

On 23 August 2016, Hirst was called up to the England U18s for the first time. In summer 2017, Hirst represented England Under 20s at the 2017 Toulon Tournament, scoring a hat-trick in a game against Cuba to take his 2016–17 tally to 40 goals in all competitions. Hirst started in the final against the Ivory Coast which England won on penalties and was subsequently named in the team of the tournament.

On 1 September 2017, Hirst scored his second hat-trick of the Summer in a victory against Poland, for England Under-19. In July 2018, Hirst was included in the squad for the 2018 UEFA European Under-19 Championship.

In May 2019, Hirst was included in the England U20 squad for the 2019 Toulon Tournament.

=== Scotland ===
On 11 March 2025, Hirst declared for Scotland through a change of association approved by FIFA. He made his full international debut later that month, in a Nations League match against Greece. Hirst then scored his first Scotland goal on 9 June 2025, during a friendly with Liechtenstein.

On 19 May 2026, Hirst was selected in the 26-man squad for the 2026 FIFA World Cup.

== Career statistics ==
=== Club ===
As of match played 21 November 2026

Appearances and goals by club, season and competition
Club	Season	League			National cup (Note: Includes FA Cup, Belgian Cup)		League cup (Note: Includes EFL Cup)		Other		Total	
Club	Season	Division	Apps	Goals	Apps	Goals	Apps	Goals	Apps	Goals	Apps	Goals
Sheffield Wednesday	2016–17	Championship	1	0	0	0	1	0	—		2	0
Sheffield Wednesday	2017–18	Championship	0	0	0	0	0	0	—		0	0
Sheffield Wednesday	Total		1	0	0	0	1	0	—		2	0
OH Leuven	2018–19	Belgian First Division B	22	3	1	0	—		—		23	3
Leicester City U23	2019–20	—			—		—		6 (Note: Appearance(s) in EFL Trophy)	3	6	3
Leicester City U23	2020–21	—			—		—		1	1	1	1
Leicester City U23	Total				—		—		7	4	7	4
Leicester City	2019–20	Premier League	2	0	0	0	0	0	—		2	0
Leicester City	2020–21	Premier League	0	0	0	0	0	0	—		0	0
Leicester City	2021–22	Premier League	0	0	0	0	0	0	—		0	0
Leicester City	2022–23	Premier League	0	0	0	0	0	0	—		0	0
Leicester City	Total		2	0	0	0	0	0	—		2	0
Rotherham United (loan)	2020–21	Championship	31	0	1	0	0	0	—		32	0
Portsmouth (loan)	2021–22	League One	40	13	0	0	1	0	5	2	46	15
Blackburn Rovers (loan)	2022–23	Championship	9	0	0	0	2	0	—		11	0
Ipswich Town (loan)	2022–23	League One	21	6	2	1	0	0	0	0	23	7
Ipswich Town	2023–24	Championship	26	7	0	0	3	0	—		29	7
Ipswich Town	2024–25	Premier League	26	3	3	2	0	0	—		29	5
Ipswich Town	2025–26	Championship	42	11	1	0	1	0	—		44	11
Ipswich Town	Total		94	21	4	2	4	0	—		102	23
Stoke City	2026–27	Championship	15	2	0	0	1	0	—		16	2
Career total			235	45	8	3	8	0	12	6	263	54

=== International ===
As of match played 6 June 2026

Appearances and goals by national team and year
National team	Year	Apps	Goals
Scotland	2025	6	1
Scotland	2026	4	0
Total		10	1

Scores and results list Scotland goal tally first, score column indicates score after each Hirst goal.

List of international goals scored by George Hirst
No.	Date	Venue	Opponent	Score	Result	Competition
1	9 June 2025	Rheinpark Stadion, Vaduz, Liechtenstein	Liechtenstein	3–0	4–0	Friendly

== Honours ==
Ipswich Town

- EFL League One runner-up: 2022–23
- EFL Championship runner-up: 2023–24, 2025–26

England U20

- Toulon Tournament: 2017

Individual

- Toulon Tournament Team of the Tournament: 2017
