= Adam Payce =

English association football player

Personal information
- Full name: Adam Stuart Payce
- Date of birth: 21 October 2004 (age 22)
- Position: Midfielder

Team information
- Current team: Moneyfields

Youth career
- Portsmouth

Senior career*
Years	Team	Apps	(Gls)
2021–2023	Portsmouth	0	(0)
2023–2024	Farnborough	3	(0)
2023	→ Sholing (loan)	6	(0)
2023–2024	→ Hartley Wintney (loan)	23	(1)
2024	Hungerford Town	0	(0)
2024	→ Badshot Lea (loan)	9	(0)
2024–2025	Horndean	13	(1)
2025	Gosport Borough	6	(0)
2025–	Moneyfields	34	(3)
- * Club domestic league appearances and goals as of 15:50, 2 June 2026 (UTC)

Adam Payce (born 21 October 2004) is an English professional footballer who plays as an attacking midfielder for Moneyfields.

== Career ==
Payce made his first-team debut for Portsmouth on 9 November 2021, in a 3–0 win over Crystal Palace U21 in an EFL Trophy fixture at Fratton Park. He went onto make a further two appearances for the club, featuring against Crawley Town and Aston Villa U21 before leaving the club at the end of his contract in June 2023.

On 28 July 2023, following his departure from Portsmouth, Payce joined National League South club, Farnborough. On 9 September, he agreed to join Southern League side, Sholing on a 56-day loan. Payce made the switch to Hartley Wintney in November that same year, signing a one-month loan deal.

Ahead of the 2024–25 campaign, Payce joined Hungerford Town following his departure from Farnborough. He then proceeded to join Isthmian League South Central Division side Badshot Lea on loan.

Following spells with Horndean and Gosport Borough, Payce joined Moneyfields in July 2025.

== Career statistics ==
As of match played 29 April 2026

Appearances and goals by club, season and competition
Club	Season	League			FA Cup		EFL Cup		Other		Total	
Club	Season	Division	Apps	Goals	Apps	Goals	Apps	Goals	Apps	Goals	Apps	Goals
Portsmouth	2021–22	League One	0	0	0	0	0	0	1 (Note: Appearance/s in the EFL Trophy)	0	1	0
Portsmouth	2022–23	League One	0	0	0	0	0	0	2	0	2	0
Portsmouth	Total		0	0	0	0	0	0	3	0	3	0
Farnborough	2023–24	National League South	3	0	0	0	—		0	0	3	0
Sholing (loan)	2023–24	Southern League Premier Division South	6	0	—		—		0	0	6	0
Hartley Wintney (loan)	2023–24	Isthmian League South Central Division	23	1	—		—		—		23	1
Hungerford Town	2024–25	Southern League Premier Division South	0	0	—		—		—		0	0
Badshot Lea (loan)	2024–25	Isthmian League South Central Division	9	0	2	0	—		2 (Note: One appearance in the Alan Turvey Trophy, one in the FA Trophy)	0	13	0
Horndean	2024–25	Isthmian League South Central Division	13	1	—		—		—		13	1
Gosport Borough	2024–25	Southern League Premier Division South	6	0	—		—		—		6	0
Moneyfields	2025–26	Isthmian League South Central Division	34	3	2	0	—		1 (Note: Appearance/s in the Isthmian League South Central Division play-offs)	0	37	3
Career total			94	5	4	0	0	0	6	0	104	5
