= Denver Hume =

English footballer (born 1998)

Personal information
- Full name: Denver Jay Hume
- Date of birth: 11 August 1998 (age 28)
- Place of birth: Ashington, England
- Position: Left-back

Youth career
- 2008–2018: Sunderland

Senior career*
Years	Team	Apps	(Gls)
2018–2022	Sunderland	68	(2)
2022–2024	Portsmouth	20	(0)
2024–2025	Grimsby Town	61	(1)
2025–2026	Fleetwood Town	8	(0)
Total		157	(3)
- * Club domestic league appearances and goals

Denver Jay Hume (born 11 August 1998) is an English former professional footballer who played as a left full-back and is now Community Engagement Officer at EFL League Two side Grimsby Town.

== Career ==
=== Sunderland ===
Born in Ashington, Hume joined Sunderland's academy at the age of 10, and made his debut for Sunderland in the final match of the 2017–18 season as a second-half substitute in a 3–0 victory over Wolverhampton Wanderers. He scored his first goal for Sunderland on 11 January 2020 in a 4–0 victory over Wycombe Wanderers.

=== Portsmouth ===
Hume joined Portsmouth on 26 January 2022 for an undisclosed fee. He signed a two-and-a-half-year contract with the option of an additional year. He made his debut for the club on 31 January 2022, in a 2–1 defeat to Charlton Athletic.

=== Grimsby Town ===
On 1 February 2024, Hume departed Portsmouth on a free transfer, joining League Two club Grimsby Town on a short-term contract until the end of the season. He made his debut for the club on 3 February 2024, in a 0–0 draw with Accrington Stanley. He scored his first goal for the club on 13 April 2024, in a 3–0 win against Crewe Alexandra. He signed a new one-year contract in June 2024.

=== Fleetwood Town ===
After rejecting a new contract with Grimsby Town, Hume signed a two-year deal with Fleetwood Town on 27 June 2025. He made his debut on 2 August, starting a 2–0 victory away to Barnet. Hume made nine appearances in all competitions for Fleetwood, with his final match being a 3–2 league victory over Harrogate Town on 11 October 2025.

Later in October 2025, Hume suffered a serious head injury during a Fleetwood training session. Hume was watching the ball when he turned his head and collided directly with another player's knee, falling immediately after the impact. A scan the following day revealed that he had sustained a fractured skull and a bleed on the brain. He spent several days in hospital under observation. Surgery was initially considered because of the location of the fracture and bleeding, but subsequent scans indicated that the injury could be allowed to heal without an operation.

Fleetwood manager Pete Wild initially described the incident as an apparently innocuous collision and said its severity had shocked both Hume and the club. Hume underwent a series of medical tests during the following weeks and was eventually permitted to undertake very light exercise, with a further assessment scheduled for January 2026. Although Wild did not initially rule out a return before the end of the season, he stated that any comeback would depend upon Hume's physical and psychological response to resuming contact training.

Hume subsequently said that the weeks following the collision had been physically and mentally difficult. He experienced low energy and struggled to undertake normal daily activities, while the seriousness of a brain injury led him to consider his long-term health rather than solely a return to football. His condition gradually improved and he recovered sufficiently to resume ordinary activities, but his symptoms persisted during attempts to work towards a playing return. Hume said that after approximately five or six months he began to recognise that he might not be medically cleared to play again.

==== Retirement ====
Following further consultations and specialist medical advice, Hume announced his retirement from professional football on 23 August 2026, aged 28. He said that he had spent the ten months following the injury attempting to process what had happened and find a route back into professional football, but had been advised that a return would not be possible. Fleetwood confirmed that his retirement took immediate effect and thanked him for his contribution to the club.

In his retirement statement, Hume reflected upon a career in which he had undergone five operations and experienced several other significant injuries. He expressed particular gratitude towards Grimsby Town, describing it as a club which had helped him “fall back in love with football” following a difficult period of his career.

On 21 November 2026, it was announced that he had joined Grimsby as Community Engagement Officer through a scheme supported by the EFL, PFA and League Football Education (LFE) which helps former professional footballers transition into non-playing roles.

== Career statistics ==
Appearances and goals by club, season and competition
Club	Season	League			FA Cup		League Cup		Other		Total	
Club	Season	Division	Apps	Goals	Apps	Goals	Apps	Goals	Apps	Goals	Apps	Goals
Sunderland U21	2017–18	—			—		—		2 (Note: Appearances in EFL Trophy)	0	2	0
Sunderland	2017–18	Championship	1	0	0	0	0	0	—		1	0
Sunderland	2018–19	League One	8	0	0	0	1	0	2	0	11	0
Sunderland	2019–20	League One	32	1	1	0	3	0	2	0	38	1
Sunderland	2020–21	League One	23	1	0	0	1	0	2 (Note: One appearance and one goal in EFL Trophy, one appearance in League One play-offs)	1	26	2
Sunderland	2021–22	League One	4	0	0	0	2	0	2	0	8	0
Sunderland	Total		68	2	1	0	7	0	8	1	84	3
Portsmouth	2021–22	League One	9	0	—		—		—		9	0
Portsmouth	2022–23	League One	11	0	3	0	0	0	6	0	20	0
Portsmouth	2023–24	League One	0	0	0	0	0	0	2	0	2	0
Portsmouth	Total		20	0	3	0	0	0	8	0	31	0
Grimsby Town	2023–24	League Two	16	1	0	0	0	0	0	0	16	1
Grimsby Town	2024–25	League Two	45	0	1	0	1	0	1	0	48	0
Grimsby Town	Total		61	1	1	0	1	0	1	0	64	1
Fleetwood Town	2025–26	League Two	8	0	0	0	1	0	0	0	9	0
Career total			157	3	5	0	9	0	19	1	190	4

== Honours ==
Sunderland

- EFL Trophy runner-up: 2018–19

Individual

- EFL League Two Team of the Season: 2024–25
- PFA Team of the Year: 2024–25 League Two
