= Ronan Curtis =

Irish association footballer (born 1996)

- Curtis in 2026

Personal information
- Full name: Ronan Curtis
- Date of birth: 29 March 1996 (age 30)
- Place of birth: Croydon, England
- Height: 5 ft 10 in (1.78 m)
- Position: Left winger

Team information
- Current team: Plymouth Argyle
- Number: 28

Youth career
- Kildrum Tigers
- Swilly Rovers
- 2014–2015: Derry City

Senior career*
Years	Team	Apps	(Gls)
2015–2018	Derry City	91	(18)
2018–2023	Portsmouth	184	(42)
2024	AFC Wimbledon	16	(5)
2024–2026	Port Vale	61	(7)
2026–	Plymouth Argyle	33	(3)

International career
2017–2018	Republic of Ireland U21	8	(1)
2018–2021	Republic of Ireland	7	(0)
- * Club domestic league appearances and goals as of 22:02, 20 October 2026 (UTC)

Ronan Curtis (born 29 March 1996) is an Irish professional footballer who plays as a left-winger for EFL League One club Plymouth Argyle and the Republic of Ireland national team.

Curtis started his career with Derry City in 2015, spending four seasons there and amassing 100 appearances and 24 goals. He agreed a deal with Portsmouth in May 2018 and joined the South Coast club for a fee believed to be approximately £100,000. He played in two EFL Trophy finals, winning the competition in 2019 and being on the losing side in 2020. He spent five seasons with Portsmouth, scoring 57 goals in 226 league and cup appearances. He left the club at the end of the 2022–23 season after sustaining a long-term knee injury. He returned to fitness and signed with AFC Wimbledon in January 2024, scoring five goals in 17 games in the second half of the 2023–24 campaign before he joined Port Vale. He was promoted out of League Two with the club at the end of the 2024–25 season. He was sold to Plymouth Argyle in January 2026.

He was born in England but moved to Ireland at age ten. He represented Ireland at under-21 level before making his senior debut in November 2018 and reaching seven caps by 2021.

== Early life and family ==
Ronan Curtis was born in Croydon, London, the youngest of eleven siblings, but moved to County Donegal when he was ten. He is the godson of Chris Coleman, who played for and managed Wales. Curtis supported Arsenal while growing up, but also watched Crystal Palace games. His mother was from Derry. His grandfather was from Cork, meaning Curtis was eligible to play for England, the Republic of Ireland or Northern Ireland until making his debut for the Republic of Ireland debut in November 2018.

He has two children with Madi: Farrah and Malachi.

== Club career ==
=== Derry City ===
Curtis joined Derry City's academy in 2014, after playing for Kildrum Tigers and Swilly Rovers. He made his senior debut at Brandywell on 8 May 2015, coming on as a second-half substitute in a 2–0 loss against Galway United. He scored his first goal for Derry on 30 October, netting his team's first in a 4–2 defeat at Longford Town. On 25 November, he signed a two-year contract extension, and ended the 2015 season with 13 appearances under the stewardship of Peter Hutton. Curtis scored a brace in a 2–2 home draw with Shamrock Rovers on 27 September 2016. He ended the 2016 season with six goals in 29 appearances as Derry secured a European qualification place with a third-place finish.

On 19 February 2017, Curtis signed a new contract extension with the Candystripes. He finished the 2017 campaign with eight goals in 32 appearances, and had a move to Swedish side Östersunds FK cancelled in August after failing to agree personal terms following an agreed transfer fee of around €150,000. Derry finished in fourth place, which was again enough to secure European football. Curtis scored on his European debut at FC Midtjylland in the 2017–18 UEFA Europa League. On 7 May 2018, amid high interest from Portsmouth, Curtis scored a hat-trick in a 7–3 home routing of Shelbourne, taking his side to the semi-finals of the League of Ireland Cup. He insisted on playing for Derry after his move to Portsmouth was confirmed and before the international transfer window opened. Derry manager Kenny Shiels criticised the move, however, stating that Derry City were a superior footballing team to Portsmouth. Curtis left the 2018 season with eight goals in 24 games, taking his final total with Derry to 24 goals in 100 league and cup appearances.

=== Portsmouth ===
On 22 May 2018, League One side Portsmouth agreed to sign Curtis from Derry City for a transfer fee in the region of £100,000 (with a £20,000 international cap bonus) on a two-year contract. Curtis made his English Football League debut at Fratton Park on 4 August, playing the full 90 minutes of a 1–0 victory over Luton Town. A week later, he scored his first two goals in a 2–1 win at Blackpool. He was nominated for that month's EFL League One Player of the Month award. He was again nominated for the League One Player of the Month award after contributing four assists and a goal in December. He missed three weeks in March after severing his finger in a "freak accident" where he trapped it in a door. He recovered in time to play in the final of the EFL Trophy at Wembley Stadium, where Pompey defeated Sunderland 5–4 on penalties following a 2–2 draw after extra time. Portsmouth also played against Sunderland in the semi-finals of the play-offs. However, he was an unused substitute as Portsmouth fell to defeat in the second leg. He ended the 2018–19 season with 13 goals and 16 assists. A Portsmouth coach was reported to have said "we hoped he'd be good but we had no idea he'd be *this* good". He won the club's Young Player of the Season award.

On 20 August 2019, Curtis scored his first goal of the new season with a header in the tenth minute of a 3–3 home draw against Coventry City. He initially struggled for form though, as did the team, before regaining his first-team place and rediscovering his form. He won the League One PFA Fans' Player of the Month after he scored four times in six appearances in November. He also won the following month's award after scoring in four successive matches, leading to speculation of a £3 million transfer to Blackburn Rovers. He banned his mother from Twitter after she tweeted criticism of teammate Brett Pitman's weight. Curtis agreed to a new three-and-a-half-year contract in February 2020. He was shortlisted for the EFL Trophy Player of the Round award after playing a crucial role in two of Pompey's goals in their semi-final victory over Exeter City. However, he missed his penalty kick in the 2020 EFL Trophy final shoot-out defeat to Salford City. Portsmouth again qualified for the play-offs and Curtis scored in the semi-finals against Oxford United, though Pompey lost on penalties.

Curtis was nominated for the League One PFA Fans' Player of the Month in August 2020. On 12 January 2021, Portsmouth announced that Curtis had tested positive for COVID-19 ahead of his club's FA Cup Third round proper game against Bristol City. The striker later spoke of the effect the illness had on his breathing, as well as his sleep pattern and dreaming. He was also dropped by manager Kenny Jackett but stated he had nothing to prove after being named as man of the match upon his return to the first XI. He went on to play up front in March following an injury crisis that left the club without any fit senior strikers. He was reportedly close to a move away in the summer, with Blackburn Rovers and Cardiff City heavily linked. However, Portsmouth cited an expected transfer fee of £2 million and no move materialised.

Assistant manager Simon Bassey blamed Curtis's lifestyle choices for his drop in form under new manager Danny Cowley, though Bassey said he "played quite well at times" in the 2021–22 campaign. He was shortlisted for the September Goal of the Month award for his curling, dipping strike in a 2–2 draw at Charlton Athletic. On 27 November, he captained the club in a 1–0 victory at Gillingham in the FA Cup. Curtis ended the season with 10 goals in 48 games, his fourth successive year of scoring double figures. He suffered an Anterior cruciate ligament injury (ACL) in February 2023 and underwent surgery. He was offered a new contract at the end of the 2022–23 season as he made his recovery. It was later confirmed by manager John Mousinho that he had turned down the contract, continuing to train with the club as he stepped up his recovery process. His 57 club goals made him Portsmouth's top-scorer of the 21st century.

=== AFC Wimbledon ===
On 19 January 2024, Curtis joined League Two club AFC Wimbledon on a short-term deal until the end of the 2023–24 season after impressing on trial. He scored on his debut eight days later in a 2–1 home victory over Mansfield Town. He scored the winning goal in the final minute of added time against AFC Wimbledon's rivals MK Dons on 2 March, earning the club their second league win in the fixture's history. The strike was later voted as the club's Goal of the Season. He was sent off for a foul on Levi Sutton in a 1–1 draw with Harrogate Town at Plough Lane on 29 March. However, manager Johnnie Jackson was highly critical of the referee's decision and unsuccessfully appealed the red card. Following the season's conclusion, Curtis was confirmed to be in discussions with the club regarding a new contract.

=== Port Vale ===
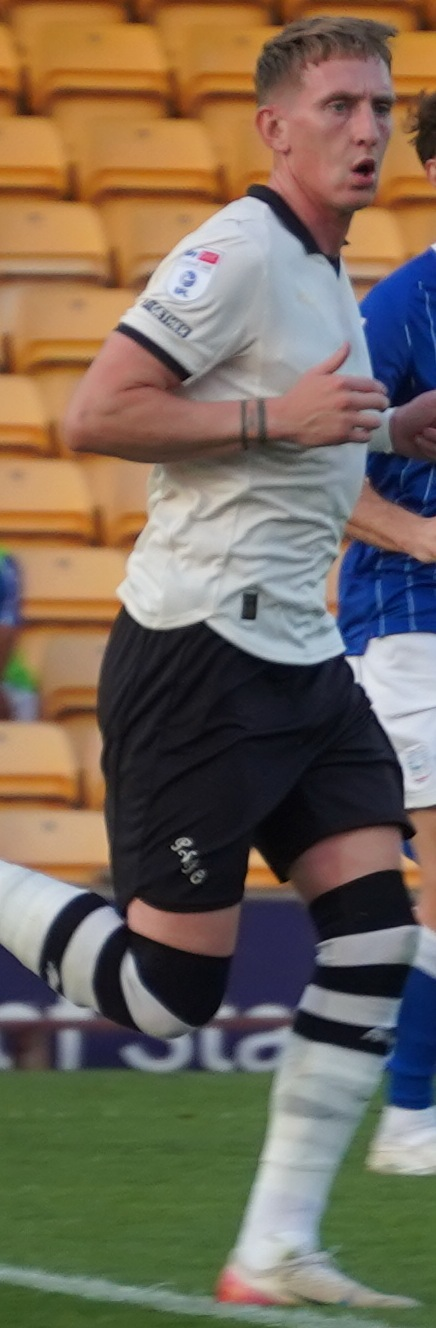
Curtis in Port Vale colours during the 2025–26 season.

On 22 May 2024, Curtis agreed to a three-year contract with Port Vale to begin on 1 July. He was Darren Moore's first signing since the club were relegated into League Two. Curtis lost his place in the first XI after Moore switched to a 3–5–2 formation midway through the 2024–25 season. Injuries to other strikers saw him gain run of starts in the new year, though he was shown a straight red card at Vale Park for being a part of a confrontation after the full-time whistle of a 2–1 win over Salford City on 22 February. The red card was rescinded on appeal. He went on to be named as the League Two Player of the Week after providing two assists from seven key passes in a 3–0 home win over Milton Keynes Dons on 15 March. He scored five goals in 42 league games throughout the campaign, helping the team to secure an automatic promotion place. Speaking in October 2025, Curtis said the team looked "dangerous on the pitch" and that whilst it was not his "top choice" to play at wing-back, he was happy to fill in at the position as the club suffered an injury crisis. He made 34 starts and 39 substitute appearances in all competitions during his time at the club, scoring seven league goals.

=== Plymouth Argyle ===
On 10 January 2026, Curtis signed a two-and-a-half-year contract with League One club Plymouth Argyle for an undisclosed fee. Director of football, Derek Adams, stated that "he is a direct, exciting winger who the Green Army will enjoy watching". He "proved his quality", said coach Kevin Nancekivell, after Curtis picked up three assists on his debut in a 4–3 EFL Trophy victory at Bristol Rovers four days later. Curtis was named as Player of the Round for the Round of 16. He played 23 games in the second half of the 2025–26 season, scoring two goals.

He underwent knee surgery to repair a meniscus tear in the summer of 2026, missing six weeks of holiday time and pre-season.

== International career ==
Although born in England, Curtis grew up in St Johnston, County Donegal and has represented the Republic of Ireland at Under-21 and senior level. On 7 September 2018, Curtis scored his first international goal in a 1–1 draw against Kosovo in the UEFA Under-21 Championship qualifying stage. He was highly rated by head coach Noel King. He was named the Republic of Ireland Under-21 International Player of the Year in 2018 and was also nominated in the International Goal of the Year category for his strike against Kosovo.

On 9 September 2018, Curtis was called up by Martin O'Neill to the senior Republic of Ireland squad for the friendly match against Poland two days later, in which he was an unused substitute. He was again added to the Ireland squad on 14 October for a UEFA Nations League encounter against Wales. He made his full Republic debut on 15 November 2018, coming on as a half-time substitute for Callum O'Dowda in a goalless friendly against Northern Ireland at the Aviva Stadium. He played in further friendlies under Mick McCarthy against Denmark, England, Gibraltar and Finland, before he said that it was a "proud moment" when he made his competitive debut in a 0–0 draw with Bulgaria in a UEFA Nations League match. He had been recalled to the squad by manager Stephen Kenny after the squad had a large number of dropouts due to COVID. He was criticised for his performance against Andorra in June 2021.

== Style of play ==
Curtis is a hard-working right-footed left-winger who can cut inside on his right foot and score goals. Portsmouth assistant manager Joe Gallen said that "He's got a lot of pace and power, and is good in the air as well".

== Career statistics ==
=== Club ===
As of match played 20 October 2026

Appearances and goals by club, season and competition
Club	Season	League			National Cup (Note: Includes FAI Cup, FA Cup)		League Cup (Note: Includes League of Ireland Cup, EFL Cup)		Other		Total	
Club	Season	Division	Apps	Goals	Apps	Goals	Apps	Goals	Apps	Goals	Apps	Goals
Derry City	2015	League of Ireland Premier Division	13	1	0	0	0	0	—		13	1
Derry City	2016	League of Ireland Premier Division	24	4	3	2	2	0	—		29	6
Derry City	2017	League of Ireland Premier Division	32	8	0	0	0	0	2 (Note: Appearance(s) in UEFA Europa League)	1	34	9
Derry City	2018	League of Ireland Premier Division	22	5	0	0	2	3	—		24	8
Derry City	Total		91	18	3	2	4	3	2	1	100	24
Portsmouth	2018–19	League One	41	11	4	0	1	0	3 (Note: Appearance(s) in EFL Trophy and EFL play-offs)	1	49	12
Portsmouth	2019–20	League One	33	11	5	2	3	0	3	1	44	14
Portsmouth	2020–21	League One	42	10	2	1	2	1	3	2	49	14
Portsmouth	2021–22	League One	43	8	2	0	1	0	2	2	48	10
Portsmouth	2022–23	League One	25	2	3	0	2	3	6	2	36	7
Portsmouth	Total		184	42	16	3	9	4	17	8	226	57
AFC Wimbledon	2023–24	League Two	16	5	0	0	0	0	1	0	17	5
Port Vale	2024–25	League Two	42	5	1	1	0	0	3	2	46	8
Port Vale	2025–26	League One	19	2	2	0	2	0	4	1	27	3
Port Vale	Total		61	7	3	1	2	0	7	3	73	11
Plymouth Argyle	2025–26	League One	21	2	—		—		2	0	23	2
Plymouth Argyle	2026–27	League One	12	1	0	0	1	0	0	0	13	1
Plymouth Argyle	Total		33	3	0	0	1	0	2	0	36	3
Career total			385	75	22	6	16	7	29	12	452	100

=== International ===
As of match played 3 June 2021

Appearances and goals by national team and year
National team	Year	Apps	Goals
Republic of Ireland	2018	2	0
Republic of Ireland	2019	1	0
Republic of Ireland	2020	3	0
Republic of Ireland	2021	1	0
Total		7	0

== Honours ==
Portsmouth

- EFL Trophy: 2018–19; runner-up: 2019–20

Port Vale

- EFL League Two second-place promotion: 2024–25

Individual

- Portsmouth Young Player of the Season: 2018–19
- FAI Under-21 International Player of the Year: 2018
- EFL League One PFA Fans' Player of the Month: November 2019, December 2019
- AFC Wimbledon Goal of the Season: 2023–24
