= 1942 Football League War Cup final =

- Event: 1942 Football League War Cup
Sunderland	Wanderers
3	6
- on aggregate

First leg
Sunderland	Wanderers
2	2
- Date: 23 May 1942
- Venue: Roker Park, Sunderland

Second leg
Wanderers	Sunderland
4	1
- Date: 30 May 1942
- Venue: Molineux Stadium, Wolverhampton

The 1942 Football League War Cup final was contested by Wolverhampton Wanderers and Sunderland. For the only time in the competition's history, the trophy was decided over a two-leg final, played on 23 May and 30 May 1942. Wolverhampton Wanderers won the tie 6–3 on aggregate.

One week after winning the Cup, Northern winners Wolves played the 1942 London Cup winners Brentford in a North v South charity decider at Stamford Bridge - the first of four consecutive years that such a club championship game was played on Chelsea's ground between the winners of the London Cup (from 1943 to 1945 renamed the Football League (South) War Cup) which was played as a single game at Wembley, and the two-legged winners of the Football League (North) War Cup. Wolves and Brentford drew the 1942 match 1-1 on 6 June in front of a crowd of 20,174. No replays were played when these North v South end of season 'deciders' at Chelsea ended in draws.

== Match details ==
=== First leg ===
23 May 1942
First leg

Sunderland	2–2	Wolverhampton Wanderers
Carter 54'; Stubbins 77'		Westcott 11', 87'

Roker Park, Sunderland
Attendance: 34,776

Sunderland
Wanderers

1	(England) Albert Heywood
2	(England) Jimmy Gorman
3	(England) John Eves
4	(England) Arthur Housam
5	(England) Billy Hewison
6	(Scotland) Alexander Hastings
7	(England) Johnny Spuhler
8	(England) Albert Stubbins
9	(England) Cliff Whitelum
10	(England) Raich Carter
11	(England) Bill Robinson
Manager:
(Scotland) Bill Murray

1	(Wales) Cyril Sidlow
2	(England) Eric Robinson
3	(England) Jack Dowen
4	(England) Dennis Thornhill
5	(England) Tom Galley
6	(England) Dicky Dorsett
7	(England) Frank Broome
8	(Scotland) Alex McIntosh
9	(England) Dennis Westcott
10	(England) Ernest Stevenson
11	(England) Jimmy Mullen
Manager:
(England) Major Frank Buckley

=== Second leg ===
30 May 1942
Second leg

Wolverhampton Wanderers	4–1	Sunderland
Westcott; Broome 51'; Rowley 59', 70'		Carter 58'

Molineux Stadium, Wolverhampton
Attendance: 43,038

Wanderers
Sunderland

1	(Wales) Cyril Sidlow
3	(England) Jack Dowen
3	(England) Frank Taylor
4	(England) Eric Robinson
5	(England) Tom Galley
6	(England) Dicky Dorsett
7	(England) Frank Broome
8	(Scotland) Alex McIntosh
9	(England) Dennis Westcott
10	(England) Jack Rowley
11	(England) Jimmy Mullen
Manager:
(England) Major Frank Buckley

1	(England) Albert Heywood
2	(England) Jimmy Gorman
3	(England) John Eves
4	(England) Arthur Housam
5	(England) Billy Hewison
6	(Scotland) Alexander Hastings
7	(England) Johnny Spuhler
8	(England) Albert Stubbins
9	(England) Cliff Whitelum
10	(England) Raich Carter
11	(Scotland) Bill Robinson
Manager:
(Scotland) Bill Murray
