= History of Portsmouth F.C. =

History of an English football club

Portsmouth Football Club is a professional association football club based in Portsmouth, England, founded in 1898. Football was first played in Portsmouth from at least the middle of the 19th century, brought to the Victorian era military town, by soldiers, sailors and dockers from other places in England. In Northern England the rules of football were already well established. Portsmouth Association Football Club was an amateur team founded in 1883 by architect Arthur Edward Cogswell. Its most famous player was Sir Arthur Conan Doyle, who played as goalkeeper under the pseudonym "A.C. Smith." The club disbanded in 1896, and Cogswell designed the Pompey public house at Fratton Park. Portsmouth Town was an amateur team before Portsmouth became a city in 1926. They competed in cup competitions, attracted several thousand spectators by 1891, and attempted to become Portsmouth's first professional club, but failed. Royal Artillery (Portsmouth) Football Club was formed by the Portsmouth regiment of the Royal Artillery. Established in 1894, they were notable for their competitive success and support from the local community. The team played home games at the United Services Recreation Ground and achieved significant victories.

The formation and development of these early clubs set the stage for the creation of Portsmouth F.C., officially named the Portsmouth Football and Athletic Company Limited, in 1898. With the backing of local businessmen, the club rapidly advanced, constructing the Fratton Park stadium and achieving entry into the Southern League. Early successes included finishing as runners-up in their first league season. Portsmouth continued to grow and evolve in the early 20th century, gaining a reputation for strong performances in the Southern League. The club was elected to the Football League Third Division in 1920, beginning a steady climb up the tiers. By the late 1920s, Portsmouth had reached the First Division, solidifying its status as a top-tier team. Despite financial challenges, the club maintained competitive performances, including reaching the FA Cup final in 1929 and 1934, although they were defeated both times.

The club’s perseverance paid off when Portsmouth won the FA Cup in 1939, defeating Wolverhampton Wanderers 4-1 in the final. This victory was a significant achievement for the club, which had struggled with financial and competitive challenges throughout the 1930s. Portsmouth's success continued post-World War II, with the team winning the First Division title in consecutive seasons, 1948–49 and 1949–50, under the management of Bob Jackson. These achievements marked the pinnacle of the club's history.

The latter half of the 20th century saw fluctuating fortunes, with periods of financial instability and relegation interspersed with success. The club faced severe financial crises in the 1970s and 1980s, leading to multiple relegations. However, the 2000s brought a resurgence, with Portsmouth winning the FA Cup again in 2008. Despite this success, financial troubles persisted, culminating in administration and relegation from the Premier League in 2010. In 2013, the Pompey Supporters Trust took ownership, stabilizing the club and beginning a new chapter focused on community ownership and sustainability.

== Precursor clubs ==
=== Portsmouth Association Football Club (1883–1896) ===
Portsmouth Association Football Club was an amateur team founded in 1883 by renowned Portsmouth architect, Arthur Edward Cogswell (1858–1934). Portsmouth AFC's most famous player was Sir Arthur Conan Doyle, the author of the Sherlock Holmes stories. Arriving in Portsmouth in June 1882, Doyle set up a medical practice at 1 Bush Villas in Elm Grove, Southsea. The practice was initially not very successful. While waiting for patients, Doyle began writing fiction, played cricket and also played as Portsmouth AFC goalkeeper under the pseudonym, "A.C. Smith". Portsmouth AFC were disbanded in 1896. Club founder Arthur Cogswell later went on to design the first buildings at Fratton Park between 1899 and 1905.

=== Portsmouth Town (?–1891–?) ===
Portsmouth Town were an amateur football team in Portsmouth, using the "Town" name before Portsmouth became a city in 1926. Portsmouth Town were reported in Portsmouth's local newspapers as having competed in cup competitions, and by 1891 and had attracted crowds of "several thousand spectators". The team had also attempted to elevate itself from amateur to professional status - to become Portsmouth's first professional football club - but the efforts failed. When Portsmouth Town were formed, or and how they ended are unclear.

=== Royal Artillery (Portsmouth) Football Club (1894–1899, 1900–1901) ===
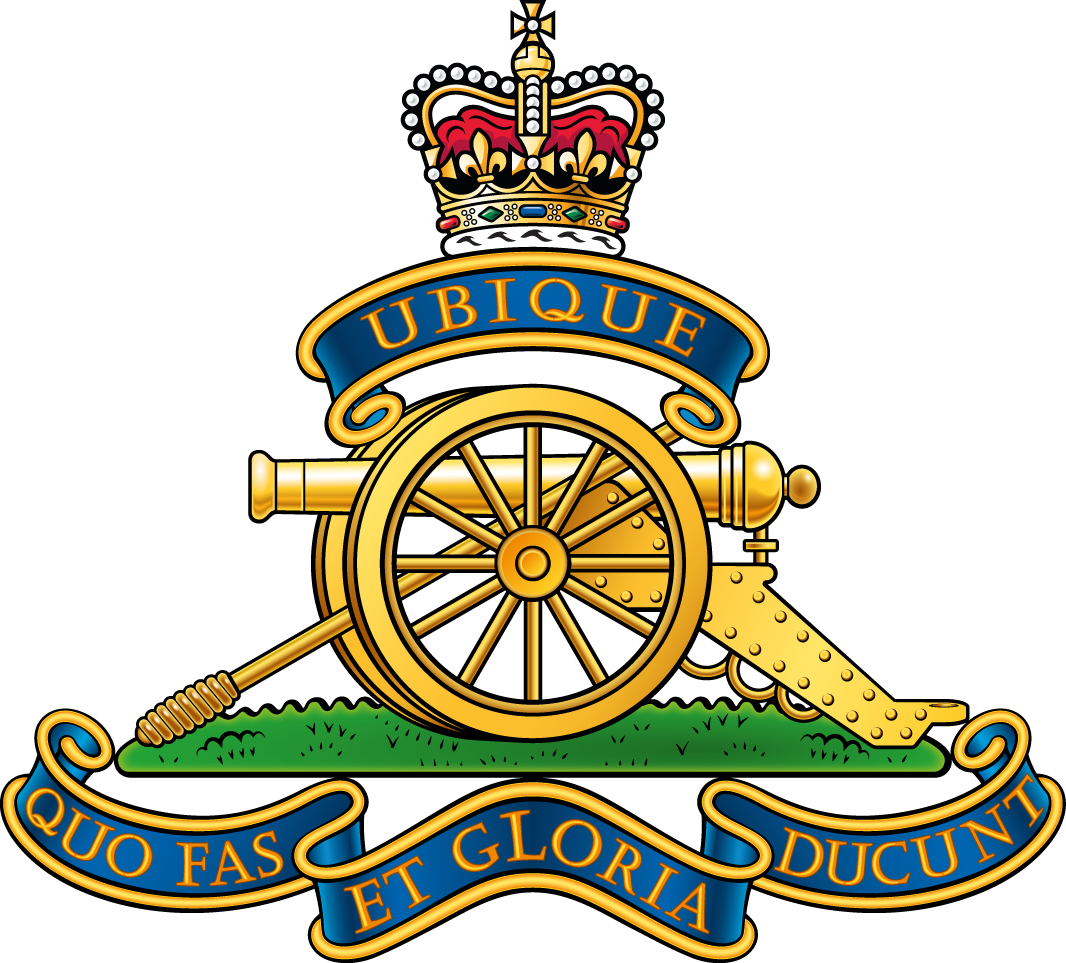
Cap badge of the Royal Artillery

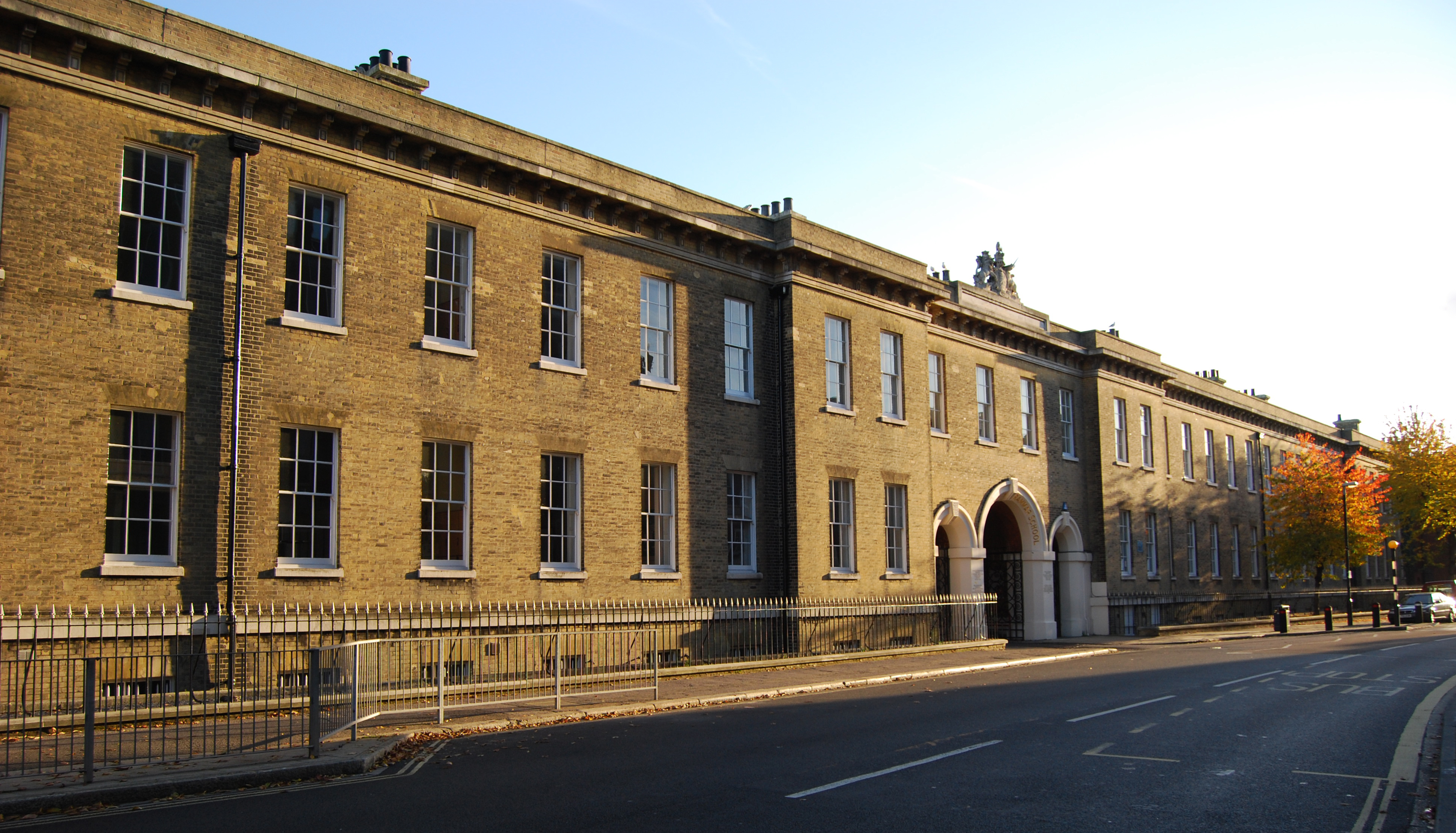
Cambridge Barracks, Portsmouth. The buildings are now part of Portsmouth Grammar School.

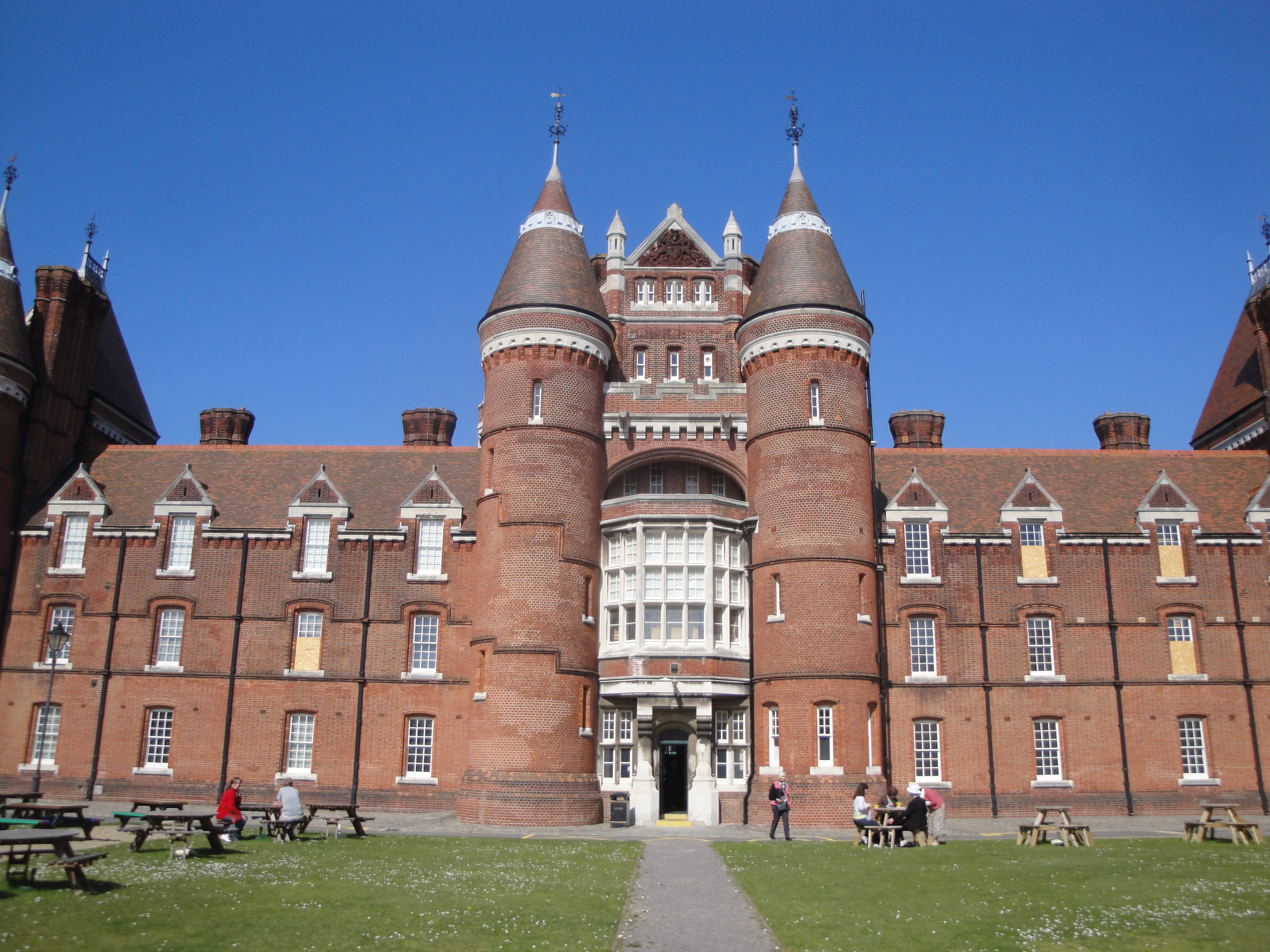
The former Clarence Barracks, now used as Portsmouth City Museum.

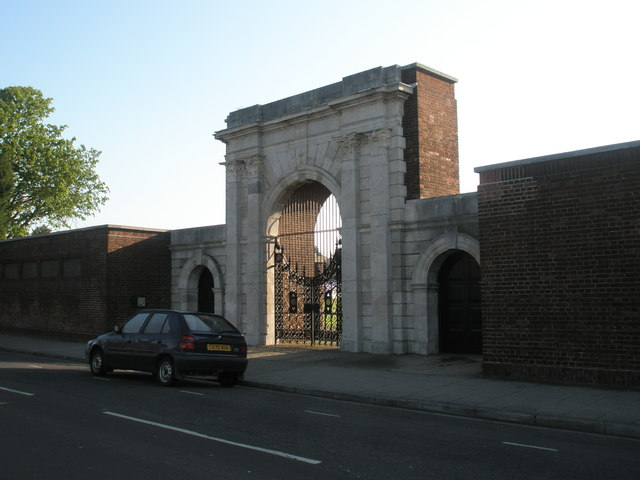
The main gates to the United Services Recreation Ground in Burnaby Road, Portsmouth.

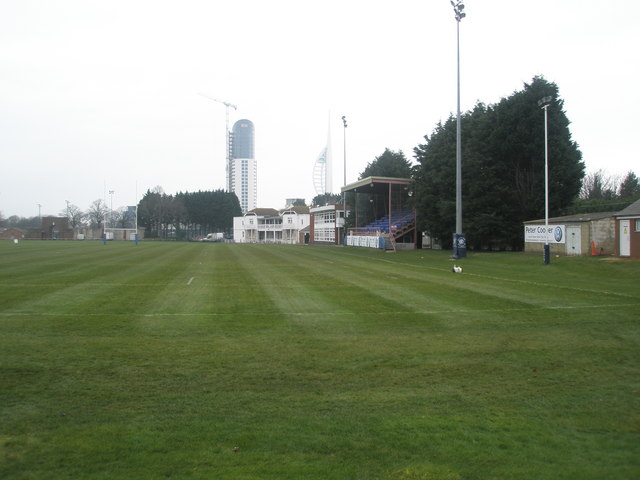
Site of the "Officer's Ground" pitch at Burnaby Road.

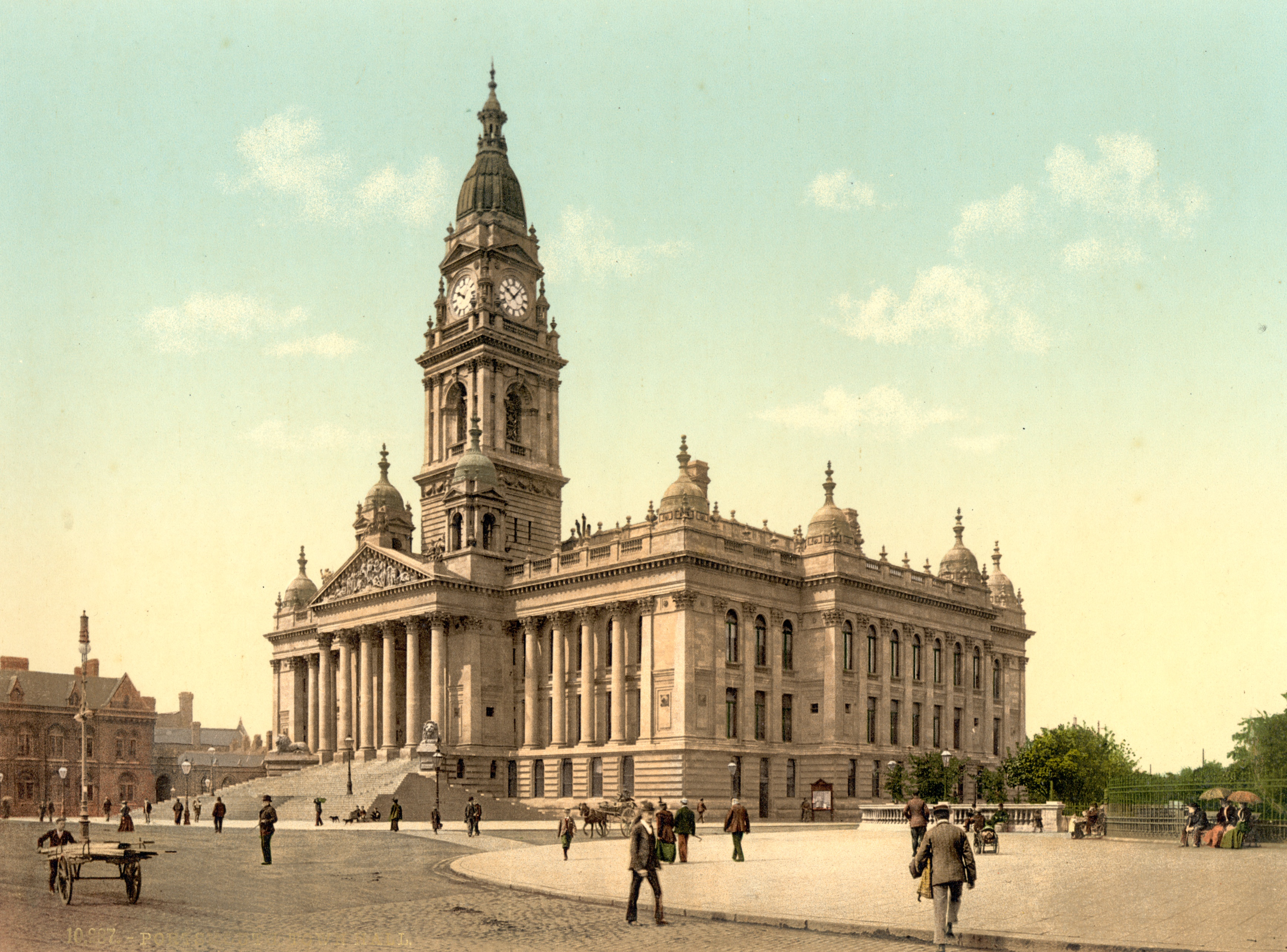
Pre-war Portsmouth Town Hall (now Portsmouth Guildhall)

Royal Artillery (Portsmouth) F.C. were a late Victorian era amateur football team formed by soldiers of the Portsmouth regiment of the Royal Artillery arm of the British Army.

In the 1890s, Portsmouth as well as having an important Royal Navy base, was also an army garrison town. Portsmouth hosted several barracks of the British army within it, including the Royal Artillery. Their officers were based at Cambridge Barracks on the High Street in Old Portsmouth, while the lower ranking men were based at Clarence Barracks (now Portsmouth City Museum). The army kept their men fit with a wide range of sports, most of which were played at the United Services Recreation Ground complex at Burnaby Road, Portsmouth.

Royal Artillery (Portsmouth) F.C. were formed in the autumn of 1894, taking the "one or two" remaining players from the Gosport-based Depot Royal Artillery team, whose team had largely been "drafted away" before the 1894-95 season began and disbanded. Depot Royal Artillery's main local rival had been 15 Company Royal Artillery, who were based at Fort Fareham in Fareham, a rivalry which was revived when Royal Artillery (Portsmouth) took over the role after the Depot team was disbanded.

Royal Artillery Portsmouth's principal members were:

- Regimental Sergeant Major Frederick Windrum - Royal Artillery's club treasurer and trainer. Windrum later became a director of Portsmouth F.C. in 1899.
- Sergeant Richard Bonney - Club secretary. Bonney later became the third Portsmouth F.C. manager in 1905.
- Sergeant John Hanna - Team captain.
- Gunner Matt Reilly - Vice-captain and 6'2" tall Irish international goalkeeper. Nicknamed as "Mick", "Ginger" and "Town Hall" (after the tallest building in 1890s Portsmouth).
- Gunner J. Fletcher - Captain of the reserve team.
- Gunner Johnny McNeill - Vice-captain of the reserve team.

Royal Artillery Portsmouth's first ever game was a friendly played on Saturday 6 October 1894 on the "Men's Ground" pitch on the western side of the United Services Recreation Ground complex in Burnaby Road, against a team from the nearby Portsmouth Grammar School. Royal Artillery won their first ever match 2-0, with two second half goals scored by Gunner Hill and Sergeant Williams.

Royal Artillery Portsmouth's first competitive match was a first-round Army Cup tie against Royal Marine Artillery, played on Tuesday 23 October 1894, again at the Men's Pitch at Burnaby Road. A single first-half goal scored indirectly from a corner kick by inside-forward Samson/Sampson was enough to give Royal Artillery their first competitive win.

In May 1897, Royal Artillery Portsmouth were denied election into the Southern League, having finished in second place in the 1896-97 Hampshire Senior League behind Cowes F.C. Two months later, Royal Artillery gained a surprise promotion into the Second Division of the 1897–98 Southern Football League, gained by the resignation of Freemantle F.C., a Southampton-based team from the Southern League. Royal Artillery finished their first season in the 1897-98 Southern Football League Division Two in top position and were promoted to Division One for the following 1898-99 season.

Royal Artillery Portsmouth were nicknamed The Gunners, because of their artillery role in the British army. The team name was often abbreviated in the press as R.A. Portsmouth, or Portsmouth R.A.. They were also nicknamed Pompey, the local nickname for the town of Portsmouth. Royal Artillery Portsmouth played their home games at the United Services Recreation Ground complex, near to Portsmouth Town Hall (now Portsmouth Guildhall), within easy earshot of the Town Hall's clock tower bell chimes, which inspired a supporter's chant named The Town Hall Chimes (which later evolved into The Pompey Chimes).

Enthusiasm and support for the Royal Artillery team was high in Portsmouth. Royal Artillery actually played on two alternating home pitches at the United Services Recreation Ground complex, the "Men's Ground" on the western side of Burnaby Road and the "Officer's Ground" to the eastern side, which also hosted Hampshire county cricket games in the summer. The United Services Recreation Ground complex was gradually enlarged to accommodate crowds of up to 8,000 supporters, with stands named "The Railway End", "The Pavilion End" and "Town Hall End".

On Saturday 25 February 1899, in the 1898–99 FA Amateur Cup quarter-finals, Royal Artillery defeated Harwich & Parkeston 1-3 in Dovercourt, Essex. Harwich & Parkeston jealously protested Royal Artillery's win and their supposed "amateur" status, accusing them of actually being professional players. A Football Association enquiry later found that the Royal Artillery players went away for a week's training at The White Lion Hotel in Aldeburgh, Suffolk before the cup-tie. The Royal Artillery players, as British army soldiers, had not individually paid for the hotel and training themselves, the army had - which the FA deemed as "professionalism". The FA Amateur cup committee agreed and Royal Artillery were disqualified from the FA Amateur Cup, and awarded the match victory to Harwich & Parkeston. Royal Artillery appealed the decision at a special FA meeting, but the FA confirmed by a majority that the Royal Artillery disqualification would stand. The law defining amateur and professional players was further amended by the FA. Royal Artillery were publicly seen as either a strong innocent team who were naive victims of unclear rules, or by some, a professional army team who purposely played in a grey area between the definitions of "amateur" and "professional".

After their expulsion from the FA Amateur Cup for "professionalism", Royal Artillery were then forced by the FA to field an entire team of amateur reserves for the remainder of the 1898–99 Southern League season, which resulted in Royal Artillery finishing bottom of the table at the end of the season. Royal Artillery then met Cowes F.C. in a relegation test match play-off. Cowes, from Division Two (South West) of the Southern League, defeated Royal Artillery 4-1, which earned Cowes a promotion to the Southern League Division One. Royal Artillery (Portsmouth) F.C. were then relegated after a single season in the Southern League's top division.

Although the 1898-99 season was now over, and their banned players were reinstated for 1899-1900, it was too late for Royal Artillery. Their best players had moved on, some even discharging from the army to join professional clubs. The operators of their home grounds at Burnaby Road too had also decided to ban football for the next 1899-1900 season, as it had been found that the football played there during 1898-99 had ruined the turf which had affected the later cricket season.

On 29 May 1899, the annual Southern League meeting took place, at the "Rainbow Tavern", 15 Fleet Street, London. Royal Artillery (Portsmouth) F.C.'s future was summed up in a brief single sentence from the minutes of the meeting: "It was noted that Royal Artillery, having been beaten by Cowes in the test match, had retired."

Royal Artillery were more respectfully remembered and rightfully credited for the rise in popularity and enthusiasm of football in the Portsmouth area at the annual meeting of the Portsmouth Football Association in July 1899.

Royal Artillery's demise lead to the growth and popularity of another newly formed local team. A year earlier, on 5 April 1898, a new football club had been formed by a consortium of local Portsmouth businessmen, chaired by Brickwood's Brewery owner John Brickwood. After the "retirement" of Royal Artillery in 1899, many of Royal Artillery's supporters - and two of their players - then switched allegiances in 1899 to the new football club, who had been preparing as newly elected members of the Southern League First Division for the 1899-1900 season. Former Royal Artillery supporters brought their Town Hall Chimes chant and Pompey nickname to a modest new football ground, built on a former potato field near the farming village of Milton The new club was officially named the Portsmouth Football and Athletic Company Limited, and they played at Fratton Park, named after the nearby and convenient Fratton railway station.

Contrary to popular belief, this was not quite the end of Royal Artillery (Portsmouth) F.C. The team, with seven of their original players was reformed in 1900. Royal Artillery rejoined the Hampshire Senior League (1900–01) and the United Services League (1900–01). Royal Artillery also played in two cup competitions, the Portsmouth Senior Cup, and the Hampshire Senior Cup. Royal Artillery did well in the Hampshire Senior League, finishing the 1900-01 season as runners-up. After the season and without warning, Royal Artillery (Portsmouth) F.C. then quietly faded away in 1901, and did not reappear.

== Portsmouth Football and Athletic Company Limited (1898–1912) ==
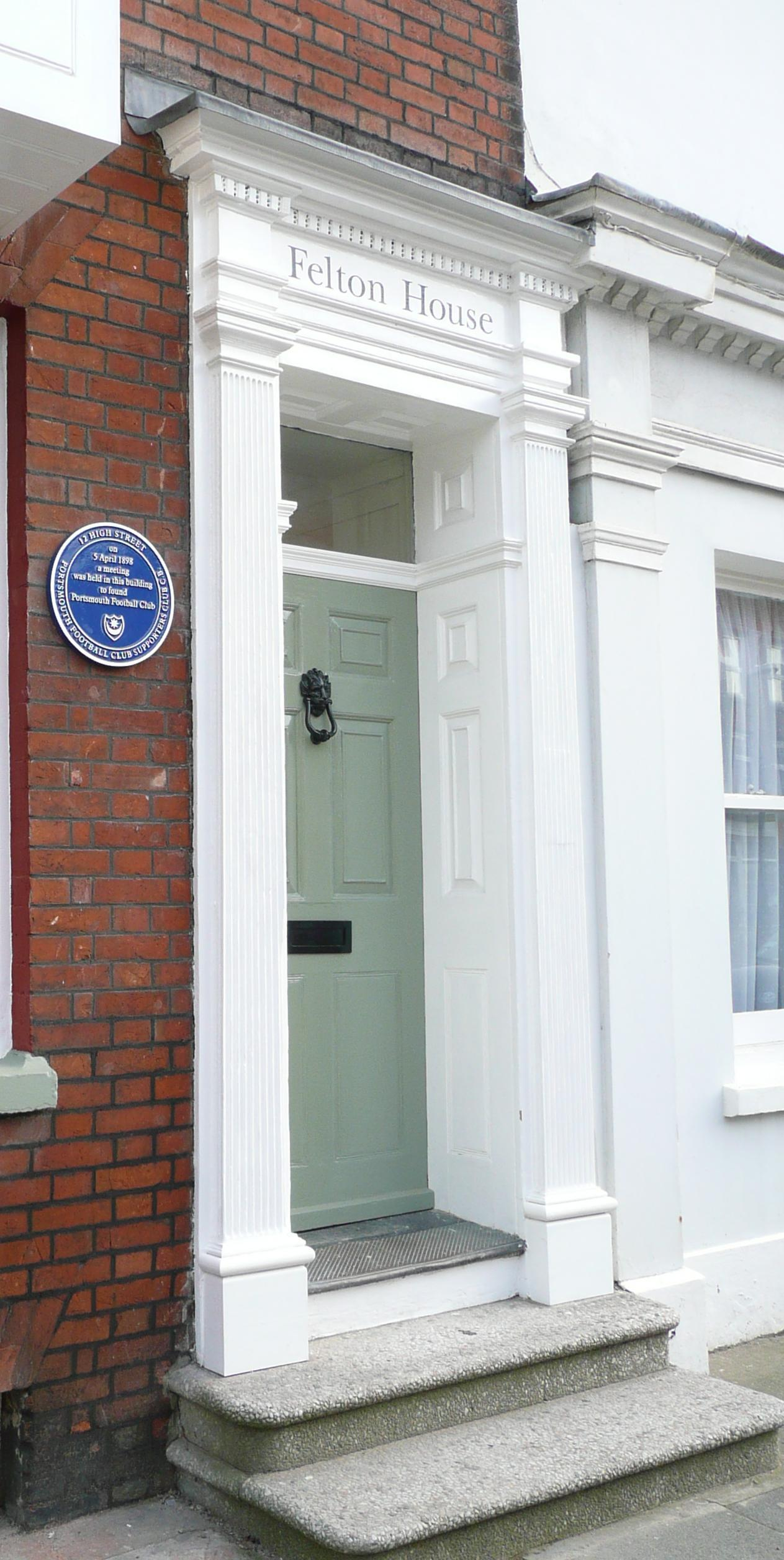
12 High Street, Old Portsmouth

On 5 April 1898, the Portsmouth Football and Athletic Company Limited - as it was originally named - was founded by John Brickwood, the owner of the Portsmouth based Brickwood's Brewery. Brickwood called together a group of five local enthusiasts to his solicitor's office at 12 High Street in Old Portsmouth to form a syndicate and share their resources to buy a piece of land on which to build a football ground. The Portsmouth Football and Athletic Company as it was originally known, had a capital of £8,000 amongst its chairman and five directors.:

- John Brickwood (1852–1932) (owner of Brickwoods Brewery, Portsmouth. Knighted by King Edward VII in 1904. In 1927, he became Sir John Brickwood, 1st Baronet Brickwood of Portsmouth.)
- Alfred H. Bone (a local architect and surveyor. Planned and built the early Fratton Park.)
- George Lewin Oliver (?–1934) (founder and headmaster of Mile End House Preparatory School, 384–388 (Old) Commercial Road, Landport, Portsmouth), locally nicknamed as 'Oliver's Academy'.
- John Peters (a wine importer)
- John Edward Pink (1866–1939) (An Alderman and solicitor, employed by John Brickwood. Became Mayor of Portsmouth in 1903.)
- William Wiggington (a government contractor and former Royal Engineers Warrant Officer)

A blue plaque on the wall of 12 High Street, Old Portsmouth (Alderman John E. Pink's office building) commemorates the founding on 5 April 1898.

Their prospectus, dated 14 May 1898, revealed that they proposed to spend £5,000 on up to five acres of agricultural land at Goldsmith Avenue near the (then) farming village of Milton to be used primarily for football and "for such outdoor games and exercises" that were approved by the directors. These were to include cycling, athletics and cricket matches. It was noted that the ground was to be built within easy reach of Fratton railway station with its convenient trains and trams and that it "was intended to drain and turf the land and erect the necessary buildings" for a further £2,000, which would leave working capital of about £1,000.

It was hoped that football in Portsmouth would become as popular as in northern England towns where attendances were between 20,000 and 30,000. The existing team at Southampton was mentioned as well as an embryonic club at Brighton and it was hoped "that a healthy rivalry would spring up that would increase the popularity and income of the company"

With the successful purchase and acquisition of a plot of agricultural land off Goldsmith Avenue near the (then) small farming village of Milton, a general meeting of shareholders was then held on 2 September 1898 at the Sussex Hotel, opposite Portsmouth's Town Hall.

Weeks later, Football Association representative William Pickford met with George Lewin Oliver to inspect and approve the land which would soon become Fratton Park. The site was shortly to be turfed and fenced and it was hoped that football could be played there after Christmas of 1898. However, the ground site was still covered with a crop of potatoes which the directors were "anxious to sell", which they eventually did, contributing to the funds of the newly formed company.

On 19 December 1898, the "Hampshire Telegraph" newspaper ran an advertisement inviting tenders "for the building of two stands: the first, 100 feet long with seven rows of seats on the south side and the second, terracing which stretched for 240 feet on the opposite, north side."

On 15 August 1899, more than 1,000 people, including some of the first Pompey players, attended the opening to see how a former potato field had been transformed into a modest football ground, now officially named as "Fratton Park".

The name, "Fratton Park" was deliberately chosen and intended to persuade Fratton Station users that "Fratton Park" was within easy walking distance. Despite its name, the Fratton Park stadium itself is actually built a mile away from the Fratton district and railway station in the Milton district of Portsmouth, and the stadium still retains a Milton "PO4 8RA" postal code today, instead of a "PO1" of Fratton and the city centre districts.

=== Early years (1899–1912) ===
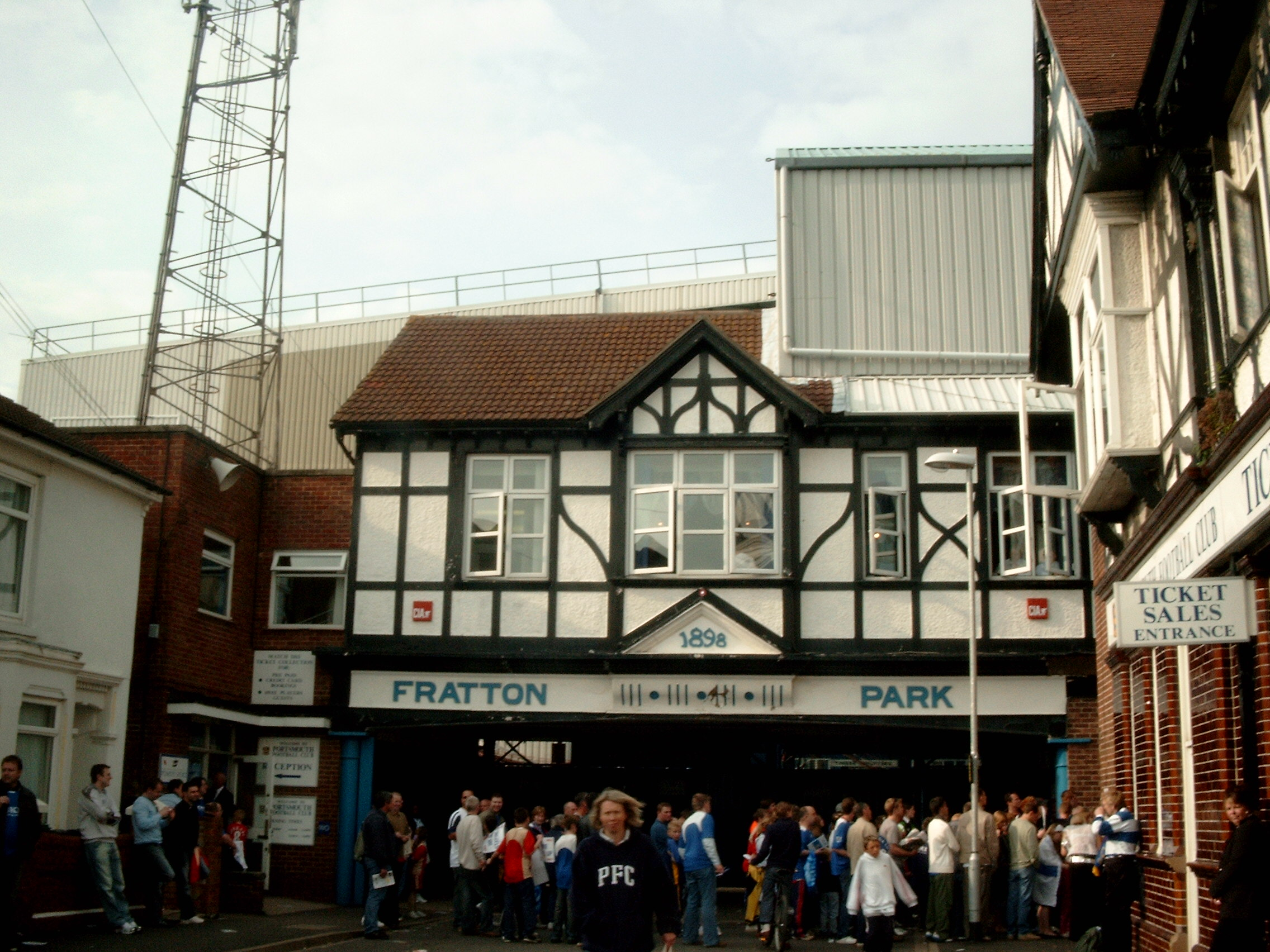
Portsmouth have played at Fratton Park since their foundation in 1898

Football was played in the city of Portsmouth from at least the 1860s, being popular with soldiers, sailors and dockers who came from northern towns and cities where association football was more widespread and established. Portsmouth were founded in 1898 with John Brickwood, owner of the local brewery, as chairman and Frank Brettell as the club's first manager. A common myth is that the club's first goalkeeper was Sir Arthur Conan Doyle. While Conan Doyle did play as AC Smith for the amateur side Portsmouth AFC, a precursor of the modern club that flourished from 1884 to 1896 the first goalkeeper of the professional era was Matt Reilly, who previously played for the successful Royal Artillery team.

In 1899, work began on developing a plot of former agricultural land near Goldsmith Avenue, Milton, Portsmouth into a new football ground, bought in 1898 from the local Goldsmith farming family. The new football ground was to be named Fratton Park after the nearby and convenient Fratton railway station.

Frank Brettell was announced as Portsmouth Football Club's first manager-secretary in February 1899, he had been secretary-player with the St Domingo Club (now Everton) in Liverpool and helped ‘create the organisation which became Everton’. Brettell joined Portsmouth in May 1899 and his first signings were Irish goalkeeper Matt Reilly and Harry Turner both from the recently "retired" Royal Artillery (Portsmouth) F.C. Also joining Portsmouth as a new director was Regimental Sergeant-Major Frederick Windrum, the treasurer-trainer from Royal Artillery.

Brettell, with his valuable northern contacts, also signed Scottish footballer Tom Wilkie, the former Heart Of Midlothian and Liverpool player. Bob Blyth and Alex "Sandy" Brown were both signed from Preston North End. Edward Turner, Harold Clarke and Harold Stringfellow all came from Everton. Dan Cunliffe, Thomas "Tommy" Cleghorn and Robert "Bobby" Marshall were all signed from Liverpool.

A bold and ambitious application for Portsmouth's direct entry into the Southern League First Division, without the usual probationary period in the lower divisions, was accepted, and the club joined the Southern Football League Division One for the 1899–1900 season, presumably to directly replace the vacancy created by the "retirement" of Royal Artillery Portsmouth F.C. at the end of the 1898-1899 season. The Southern League were very keen to see a professional team from Portsmouth join the Southern League, the Southern League secretary, Mr Nat Whittaker was quoted in the press as saying; "Personally, I think there is a great future for 'socker'(sic) generally in Portsmouth and if they can only do well next season the success of the club is assured. Help them? Of course I will, and anyone else who wants to make football grow in the south". Whittaker also said he was confident that Portsmouth would be elected into the league by the other clubs at the next general meeting of the Southern League, which they were.

Portsmouth's first competitive Southern League match was played away at Chatham Town at Maidstone Road, Chatham on Saturday 2 September 1899, which Portsmouth won 1–0, the first Portsmouth goal was scored by Harold Clarke. Four days later, on Wednesday 6 September 1899, the first ever home match at Fratton Park was played; a friendly against local town rivals Southampton, which Portsmouth won 2–0, with goals from Dan Cunliffe (formerly with Liverpool) and Harold Clarke (formerly with Everton). Portsmouth's first competitive Southern League home match followed on Saturday 9 September, a 2-0 win against Reading F.C., with goals scored by Harold Clarke and Dan Cunliffe, attended by a crowd of up to 7000 supporters. Portsmouth's first 1899–1900 season in the Southern Football League Division One was successful, with the club winning 20 out of 28 league matches, earning them the runner-up spot in the table behind champions, Tottenham Hotspur.

In their second 1900–01 Southern Football League Division One season, Portsmouth finished in third place behind second place Bristol City and first place Southampton. Portsmouth also joined the 1900-01 Western Football League and finished top as Division One champions. Also in 1900, Portsmouth chairman John Brickwood had Arthur Cogswell design and build another Brickwood's Brewery pub, this one next to Fratton Park at 44 Frogmore Road, and named it "The Pompey".

The following 1901–02 season saw Portsmouth player Bob Blyth become Portsmouth's second manager on 1 August 1901, replacing Frank Brettell who had left on 31 May 1901. Portsmouth won the 1901–02 Southern Football League championship title. However, Portsmouth were not promoted and no teams were relegated. No clubs had applied for election to the Football League proper. In the 1901-02 Western Football League, Portsmouth also won the Division One championship for a second consecutive season.

In the 1902–03 Southern Football League, Portsmouth finished in third place. In the 1902-03 Western Football League, Portsmouth won the Division One championship for a third consecutive season.

The following 1903–04 Southern Football League saw a fourth-place finish. On 5 July 1904, Portsmouth Chairman and Brickwoods Brewery owner, Sir John Brickwood was Knighted by His Majesty, King Edward VII. In the 1903-04 Western Football League, Portsmouth finished in fourth position behind champions Tottenham Hotspur.

In the 1904–05 Southern Football League, Portsmouth finished mid-table in eighth place. In the 1904-05 Western Football League, Portsmouth finished in fourth position behind champions Plymouth Argyle.

Richard Bonney, the ex-army soldier who had co-founded Royal Artillery (Portsmouth) F.C. in 1894, became Portsmouth's third manager on 1 August 1905 for the 1905–06 Southern Football League. Portsmouth finished in third place. In the 1905-06 Western Football League, Portsmouth finished in seventh position behind champions Queens Park Rangers. A new club pavilion was designed and built by Portsmouth director Alfred H. Bone in the south-west corner of Fratton Park, which housed the club offices and player's changing rooms. John Brickwood also donated a clock tower spire to the east side of the new pavilion.

In the 1906–07 Southern Football League, Portsmouth ended the season as runners-up for a second time, after Fulham won the title by just two points. Meanwhile, in the 1906–07 Western Football League, the top Division One was split into equal 'A' and 'B' sections, with a playoff between the two section winners to decide a Division One champion. Portsmouth finished in third position in the 'B' section of Division One. The 1906–07 season was highlighted by the visit of Manchester United to Fratton Park in the FA Cup, which generated a record attendance of 24,329. A 2–2 draw meant a replay in Manchester, where Portsmouth recorded a famous 2–1 win.

At the end of the 1907–08 Southern Football League, Portsmouth finished in a disappointing ninth place. In the 1907–08 Western Football League, Portsmouth finished as runners-up in the 'A' section of Division One.

The next 1908–09 season, Portsmouth finished in fourth position. In their last 1908–09 Western Football League appearance, Portsmouth finished in fourth position of the 'B' section of Division One. At the end of the season, all fourteen members of the split 'A' and 'B' sections of Division One resigned from the Western Football League.

For the 1909–10 Southern Football League, Portsmouth abandoned their salmon pink and maroon "Shrimps" era shirts and changed their colours to white shirts, navy blue shorts and navy blue socks. Portsmouth ended their season in sixth place.

Portsmouth had a disastrous 1910–11 Southern Football League season, winning only 8 of their 38 games and were relegated. Manager Richard Bonney was then let go. A severe financial crisis struck between seasons and a public appeal for funds in May 1911 kept the club afloat.

== Portsmouth Football Company Limited (1912–1999) ==
With the recruitment of Robert Brown from Sheffield Wednesday as Portsmouth's fourth manager, the team finished second place in the 1911–12 Southern Football League Division Two behind Merthyr Town and were promoted as runners-up. However, the club's finances were in trouble again, with losses and debts increasing to £10,000. A shareholders meeting was called on 8 May 1912, where George Lewin Oliver, one of the original founders and directors, proposed that "The Portsmouth Football and Athletic Company" should be wound up and replaced with a more business orientated company. The original company was then liquidated to remove the debt and on 27 July 1912, Portsmouth Football Company Limited was formed as the new parent company of Portsmouth F.C., with substantial financial guarantees given by the board of directors. The original 1898 founding director George Lewin Oliver became the new Portsmouth chairman.

For the new 1912–13 Southern Football League season back in Division One, Portsmouth, now under new ownership, wore new home colours of blue shirts, white shorts and black stockings. Portsmouth finished the season in 11th position.

Portsmouth's now famous crest, consisting of a crescent moon and star made its first appearance in the 1913–14 season. The moon and star motif comes from the Portsmouth town (then) coat of arms and are believed to date back as far as the time of Richard I. Curiously, the star on the original badge featured a star with five points rather than the eight that appear on the town crest. Portsmouth ended the season in 9th position.

Football was suspended during the 1914–1918 First World War, then known as 'The Great War'. Many with connections to Portsmouth F.C. joined the "Pompey Pals Battalions", which formed parts of the Hampshire Regiment. Many never returned home. In 1915, the Fratton End terrace was upgraded to accommodate 8,000 standing supporters and covered with a roof for the first time.

On 24 April 1916, an Easter Monday, two charity fund-raising matches between Portsmouth FC and Southampton FC both simultaneously took place at both Fratton Park and Southampton's The Dell. The Fratton Park game was won by Portsmouth 7-0; the other match at The Dell was won by Portsmouth 2-3.

On 6 June 1918, an American army team played a Canadian army team in a baseball match at Fratton Park, with the gate money donated to the British Red Cross. The US army team won 4-3.

Following the resumption of matches in the 1919–20 season, Portsmouth won the Southern League championship for the second time (the first occasion being in 1901–02). Portsmouth were then elected to the Football League Third Division as founder members. John McCartney took over as the fifth manager of Portsmouth on 1 May 1920 from Robert Brown who had left to join Gillingham F.C., also in The Football League.

=== Climbing up the Football League (1920–1927) ===
Southern Football League champions Portsmouth coincidentally began the inaugural 1920–21 season in England's Football League Third Division as founder members and finished 12th that year.

The following 1921–22 season, Football League Third Division was split into North and South sections (which continued until 1958). The Third Division South was mainly the continuation of the Third Division of the previous 1920-21 season, while most of the teams in Third Division North were newcomers to the Football League. Portsmouth finished third in the 1921-22 Third Division South season.

In the 1922–23 season in Third Division South, Portsmouth finished in seventh position.

Portsmouth won the Third Division South title in the 1923–24 season and were promoted to the Football League Second Division.

Portsmouth's debut season in the 1924–25 Second Division season was a successful one, finishing in fourth place behind Derby County, Manchester United and the division champions, Leicester City.

At the beginning of the 1925–26 Second Division season, a new South Stand was designed by renowned football architect Archibald Leitch and was opened by the then Football League President, John McKenna on 29 August 1925, just before the kickoff against Middlesbrough. The season ended with Portsmouth in eleventh position.

The club continued to perform well in the Second Division, winning promotion to the First Division by finishing runners-up in the 1926–27 Second Division season, gaining a new club record 9–1 Fratton Park home win over Notts County along the way, which is still the highest home win scoring record to date. Portsmouth's promotion to the top division in English football was a double celebration; the first achieved by a football club based south of London, and the first achieved by a club graduating from the Third Division to the First Division.

=== Life at the top and FA Cup victory (1927–1939) ===
South Shields manager Jack Tinn joined Portsmouth as new manager on 1 May 1927, replacing John McCartney who had resigned due to ill health. Portsmouth's debut season in the 1927-28 First Division was a struggle, finishing one point and one place above relegation.

The next 1928–29 season in the First Division, Portsmouth continued to falter, losing 10–0 away at Filbert Street to Leicester City, which is still a club record away defeat. Despite their failings in the Football League, however, that season also saw Portsmouth reach the FA Cup Final for the first time, which they lost to Bolton Wanderers. One Pompey supporter is reported to have "carried a black cat, with the club colours around its neck" to the 1929 FA Cup Final. Portsmouth managed to survive relegation, finishing one place above relegation.

From 1929 to 1934, Portsmouth had become a regular top-half table finisher in the First Division. The 1933–34 season saw Portsmouth again reach the FA Cup final for a second time, having beaten Manchester United, Bolton Wandereres, Leicester City and Birmingham City on the way. The club was again defeated in the FA Cup Final, this time by Manchester City.

Halfway through the 1934-35 season, on 23 December 1934, the original 1898 founding director and later Portsmouth chairman, George Lewin Oliver passed away. Using money from the June 1934 sale of defender Jimmy Allen and money from the 1934 FA Cup Final, Portsmouth F.C. announced at Christmas 1934 that Fratton Park's North Stand was to be demolished and replaced with a much larger stand, increasing the ground capacity to more than 58,000. The 1934–35 season ended with Portsmouth in fourteenth position and seven points above relegation.

On 7 September at the beginning of the 1935–36 First Division season, in a home game against Aston Villa, the new North Stand was opened by John McKenna, who had also opened Fratton Park's new South Stand ten years earlier. Former Portsmouth defender Jimmy Allen, whose sale in 1934 had largely paid for the new North Stand, was present at the game, as captain of the visiting Aston Villa team! The new North Stand briefly held the nickname of "The Jimmy Allen Stand" for a while afterwards. Portsmouth ended the 1935–36 season in tenth place.

Having established themselves in the top flight, the 1938–39 season saw Portsmouth reach the FA Cup Final for the third time with manager Jack Tinn, who had worn his 'lucky' spats throughout the qualifying rounds. This was indeed third time lucky, as Portsmouth managed to defeat favourites Wolverhampton Wanderers 4–1 in what the press had dubbed, 'The Gland Final' – a reference to 'monkey gland' testosterone injections – used by both teams (and others) that season. Bert Barlow and John 'Jock' Anderson scored, whilst Cliff Parker scored twice (third and fourth goals).

The new 1939–40 season in the First Division began on 26 August 1939. On 1 September 1939, Germany invaded Poland. On 2 September 1939, all divisions of the Football League played their third and final game of the season, with Blackpool F.C. at the top of the table and Portsmouth in 18th position. These would be the last national Football League fixtures before abandonment following the British declaration of war on Germany on Sunday 3 September 1939. Large gatherings of crowds were suspended with the implementation of the Emergency Powers (Defence) Act 1939.

=== World War II and post-war (1939–1948) ===
Despite the breakout of another World War in September 1939, football competitions did take place, with the Football League being split into ten regional mini Wartime Leagues, with Portsmouth in 'League South'. An annual national cup competition was held too, called the Football League War Cup. Nevertheless, with the Wartime Leagues in operation, Pompey signed various players of other clubs who happened to be serving in the Forces and stationed near Portsmouth, on a temporary basis. One such was Andy Black of Heart of Midlothian, who on one notable occasion scored eight goals in a 16–1 thrashing of Clapton Orient.

In 1942, Portsmouth reached the London War Cup final, a competition that had begun only a season earlier in 1940–41. The London War Cup was held once again during the 1941–42 season and was intended by its organisers to stand in for the FA Cup, despite the official Football League War Cup competition taking place annually since 1939. The London War Cup competition required Portsmouth, the current FA Cup champions, to secede from the Football Association to enter. Portsmouth progressed to the 1942 London War Cup final at Wembley Stadium, but were beaten by Brentford and finished as runners-up. After the competition, Portsmouth paid a ten Pounds readmission fee to rejoin the Football Association again. The London War Cup competition was never played again. Ironically, the London War Cup trophy won by Brentford in 1942 was reused for subsequent Football League War Cup competitions. The trophy was last presented in 1945 to Chelsea and remains in their club museum today.

During his wartime visits to Portsmouth, Field Marshal Montgomery became interested in Portsmouth Football Club and was made honorary President of Portsmouth F.C. in 1944 (until 1961).

The end of World War II in 1945 caused Portsmouth to hold the distinction of holding the FA Cup trophy for the longest uninterrupted period - seven years - as it was not presented again until 1946. Manager Jack Tinn was rumoured to have kept the trophy 'safe under his bed' during a part of the war. Because the naval city of Portsmouth was a primary strategic military target for German Luftwaffe bombing, the cup was routinely moved around the city of Portsmouth for its safety and protection, moving from Fratton Park's boardroom, into bank vaults, back to Fratton Park and around local pubs. During the worst of the bombing on Portsmouth, the FA Cup trophy was also taken ten miles north to the nearby Hampshire village of Lovedean, where it was kept and displayed in a quaint thatched roof country pub called The Bird in Hand. In 1945, the FA Cup trophy was taken around the streets of Portsmouth and proudly shown off at Victory in Europe Day street parties.

The FA Cup competition was resumed for the 1945–46 season, but the resumption of the Football League had to wait one more year. Portsmouth, as a Division One team and as the "current" holders (from 1939!), were drawn to play against Birmingham City in the Third Round stage. The first leg of the tie was played at Birmingham's St. Andrew's stadium on 5 January 1946 and resulted 1–0 in Birmingham City's favour; the second leg at Fratton Park ended 0–0 on 9 January 1946, with Birmingham City winning 1–0 on aggregate. The FA Cup trophy was not to stay with Portsmouth for an eighth consecutive year and was returned to the Football Association in time for the 1946 FA Cup Final, in which Derby County were the winners and awarded the trophy. The FA Cup trophy would not return to Portsmouth's trophy cabinet for another sixty-two years, when Portsmouth defeated Cardiff City 1−0 in the 2008 FA Cup Final.

The Football League finally resumed in 1946–47. Portsmouth had capitalised on the footballers called up to serve in the Royal Navy and Royal Marines in the war years and recruited some of them. In this way, they had the pick of some of the best. Portsmouth ended the 1946–47 First Division season in 12th place. On 1 May 1947, manager Jack Tinn left Portsmouth, with Bob Jackson taking over the role on the same day.

The second post-war Football League season resumed under manager Bob Jackson in 1947–48. This was also the first season Portsmouth wore red socks, which replaced their traditional black socks; this was an idea proposed by the club's honorary president, Field Marshal Montgomery, who had suggested that Portsmouth should wear red socks to commemorate the sacrifice of British servicemen lost in war. Red is traditionally the colour of the British Army and also of the Remembrance poppy flower, and so Montgomery's idea was adopted by Portsmouth at the start of the season. Bob Jackson's team finished in 8th place at the end of the 1947–48 First Division season.

=== Glory years (1948–1959) ===
In Pompey's 50-year "Golden Jubilee" anniversary 1948–49 season, Bob Jackson's Portsmouth side were tipped to be the first team of the 20th century to win a historic Football League and FA Cup "double". The potential of a rare 'Double' saw Fratton Park attracting average home attendances of 36,000 supporters, and a record attendance of 51,385 in an FA Cup quarter-final match against Derby County on 26 February 1949, which Portsmouth won 2–1. The Fratton Park record attendance of 51,385 still stands today. Portsmouth crashed out 1–3 in the FA Cup semi-final against Leicester City on 26 March 1949 at the neutral Highbury stadium. Portsmouth however made up for it by claiming the league title in spectacular fashion, winning one half of the 'Double' by securing the First Division title and becoming Football League Champions of England at the end of the 1948–49 season, with Manchester United finishing as runners-up.

Portsmouth's championship winning team consisted of Ernest Butler, Phil Rookes, Harry Ferrier, Jimmy Scoular, Reg Flewin, Jimmy Dickinson, Peter Harris, Duggie Reid, Ike Clarke, Len Phillips, Jack Froggatt, Jasper Yeuell, Lindy Delapenha, Bert Barlow, Jimmy Elder and Cliff Parker.

Bob Jackson's Portsmouth side retained the title, beating Aston Villa 5–1 on the last day of the following 1949–50 season, winning the Football League title again for a second consecutive season – on goal difference – as both Portsmouth and runners up Wolverhampton Wanderers finished the season with 53 points each, and only one point ahead of third place Sunderland on 52 points. Portsmouth are one of only five English teams to have won back-to-back consecutive top flight League titles since the end of World War II.

In the following 1950–51 season, League champions Portsmouth finished in 7th position, 13 points behind title winners Tottenham Hotspur.

The next 1951–52 season saw an improvement, with Portsmouth finishing in 4th place, 9 points behind title winners Manchester United.

Eddie Lever took over at Pompey in 1952 after championship-winning manager Bob Jackson joined Hull City. In the 1952–53 season, Portsmouth finished in 15th place and only 4 points above the relegation zone, with Arsenal F.C. winning the league title.

In the 1953–54 season, Portsmouth finishing in 14th place, 9 points above relegation. Wolverhampton Wanderers won the League this season.

Portsmouth finished third in the 1954–55 season, only 4 points behind winners Chelsea F.C.

In the 1955–56 season, on 22 February 1956, Fratton Park hosted the Football League's first ever floodlit evening game, against Newcastle United, played under floodlights erected on top of the North Stand and South Stand roofs. Portsmouth ended the season in 12th place in Division One.

The original solid earthbank Fratton End stand was replaced in 1956 with a new stand built from prefabricated concrete and steel. It had two distinctive terraced tiers, a roofed upper terrace and an open-air lower terrace. In the 1956–57 season, Portsmouth escaped relegation by four points and finished two places above the drop zone.

In the following 1957–58 season, Portsmouth once again escaped relegation on goal difference and finished one place above the relegation zone. Manager Eddie Lever left Portsmouth in April 1958.

Freddie Cox became new Portsmouth manager in August 1958. The new 1958-59 season was the first Football League season with four national divisions. The two old regional Third Divisions (North and South) which had begun in the 1921–22 season were restructured and replaced with two new national divisions, named the Third Division and Fourth Division. At the end of the 1958–59 season Portsmouth finished bottom of the First Division, ending their 32-year stay in the First Division, and relegation to the Second Division. By now, the championship winning team of 1949 and 1950 had been broken up, caused by aging or injury.

=== Life in the lower league (1959–1976) ===
Following the bottom-place finish in the previous 1958–59 First Division season, Portsmouth started the 1959–60 season in the Second Division, the second tier of English football – which Portsmouth had last been in during the 1926–27 season. After another poor season, they escaped a further relegation to the Third Division only by 2 points and finishing only one place above the relegation zone.

In the 1960–61 season Portsmouth finished second-to-last place in the Second Division relegation zone and were relegated once again to the Third Division, (the first former English League champions to do so). Manager Freddie Cox was sacked in February 1961.

Under the guidance of George Smith, Portsmouth, now in the Third Division for the 1960–61 season had a good season and were promoted back to the Second Division at the first time of asking after winning the Third Division title. Field-Marshal Bernard 'Monty' Montgomery of Alamein, was the honorary President of Portsmouth FC, having begun to support them during World War II due to the proximity of his headquarters at Southwick House on the outskirts of Portsmouth. In private correspondence dated 25 April 1962, he wrote to Smith: ‘I congratulate you very much on getting Portsmouth out of the Third Division – which was completely a wrong place for a famous team. While the players all did their stuff, the major credit goes to you.’

Despite limited financial means, manager George Smith maintained Portsmouth's Second Division status throughout the rest of the 1960s until Smith was replaced by Ron Tindall in April 1970 as Smith moved upstairs to become general manager in April 1970, until his retirement from football in 1973.

The cash injection that accompanied the arrival of John Deacon as chairman in 1972 failed to improve Portsmouth's Second Division position. Ron Tindall was replaced in May 1973 by John Mortimore. However, Ron Tindall returned for two games as caretaker manager after manager John Mortimore left in 1974. Ian St. John became new Portsmouth manager in September 1974.

With Deacon unable to continue bankrolling the club on the same scale, Portsmouth finished bottom of the Second Division in the 1975–76 season and were relegated down to the Third Division.

=== Near oblivion (1976–1979) ===
During the 1976–77 Third Division season, in November 1976, the club found itself needing to raise £25,000 to pay off debts and so avoid bankruptcy. The money was partly raised from supporter contributions after a campaign led by the local newspaper The News. With players having to be sold to ease the club's financial situation, and no money available for replacements, Portsmouth were forced to rely on inexperienced young players. They ended the 1976–77 season only one place and one point above the Third Division's relegation zone.

On 4 May 1977, former Portsmouth and England international player Jimmy Dickinson became the new Portsmouth manager, replacing Ian St. John. Consequently, they were relegated at the end of the new 1977–78 Third Division season, finishing in bottom place.

During this period and throughout the later 1980s, Portsmouth was one of a number of football clubs with a reputation for hooliganism. The most notorious gang was called the 6:57 Crew, a self-proclaimed "casual firm" of football hooligans whose name came from the fact that many supporters would catch the 6:57 train from nearby Fratton railway station to London for away games. The advent of all-seater stadia following the Taylor Report into the Hillsborough disaster of 1989 contributed to a decrease in organised football-related violence, and the 6:57 Crew was gradually reduced to nothing by the 1990s. Two books have been written about the 6:57 Crew, Rolling With The 6.57 Crew by Cass Pennant and Rob Silvester and Playing Up With Pompey By Bob Beech.

In the 1978–79 Fourth Division season, Portsmouth finished in 7th position. Jimmy Dickinson was then replaced by Frank Burrows.

=== Bouncing back (1979–1988) ===
Portsmouth F.C. badge in the 1980s.

The club's fortunes began to turn around with the appointment of Frank Burrows as manager in 1979, as Portsmouth won their first five Division Four games and eventual promotion to the Third Division after finishing in 4th place in the 1979–80 Fourth Division season.

In the early 1980–81 Third Division season, Portsmouth won their first four league games consecutively and nearly won a second successive promotion to the Second Division, but finished short in sixth place.

The following 1981–82 Third Division season, Portsmouth finished mid table in thirteenth position. On 21 May 1982, Frank Burrows departed to take a coaching job at Sunderland instead. Bobby Campbell succeeded him as the new Portsmouth manager.

During the 1982–83 Third Division season, former Portsmouth player, manager and England international Jimmy Dickinson died aged 57 on 8 November 1982 after suffering three heart attacks. A public memorial service was held at a packed St. Mary's Church in Fratton, Portsmouth. Dickinson was laid to rest in Alton, Hampshire. Pompey later that season won the 1982–83 Third Division championship title under Bobby Campbell, gaining promotion back to the Second Division in his first season.

In the 1983–84 Second Division season, Portsmouth finished sixteenth place in the table, and also saw the indignity of an FA Cup exit to rivals Southampton. While the club were never in serious danger of relegation, it was all enough to cost Bobby Campbell his job, to be replaced by former England international and 1966 FIFA World Cup winner, Alan Ball on 11 May 1984.

Under Alan Ball, Portsmouth missed winning promotion to the First Division in the 1984–85 Second Division season, finishing in fourth place on goal-difference. They also finished in fourth place again in the following 1985–86 season too.

In Alan Ball's third season as Portsmouth manager in the 1986–87 Second Division season, Portsmouth finished as runners-up behind Derby County F.C., gaining promotion back to the First Division for the first time since the 1958–59 season. During the season, the upper tier of the Fratton End stand, built only thirty years earlier in 1956, was closed due to structural concerns, leaving only the lower tier of the Fratton End open to fans.

By the middle of the new 1987–88 First Division season, the club was again in financial trouble. Portsmouth were relegated straight back down to the Second Division. The summer of 1988 saw chairman John Deacon sell the club to London-based businessman and former Queens Park Rangers chairman, Jim Gregory. Fratton Park was in a poor condition, with the Fratton End still half closed to fans and leaking roofs in the North and South stands.

With new chairman Jim Gregory injecting money into the club, work began in the summer of 1988 to demolish the unsafe upper tier of the Fratton End and its roof. The North and South stands were refurbished and both received new blue-coloured metal sheet roofs.

=== Sleeping giant (1988–2002) ===
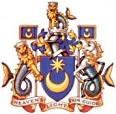
Portsmouth crest from 1993-1997.

Relegated Portsmouth began life back down in the Second Division well, winning their first three league games consecutively. The club's parent company had a name change from 'Portsmouth Football Company Limited' to 'Portsmouth Football Club Limited' on 23 January 1989. Alan Ball remained as Portsmouth manager until January 1989, curiously leaving the club when they were in the top six and still looking like good bets for promotion back to the First Division. Jim Gregory then appointed John Gregory (no relation) as Portsmouth's new manager, but their form in the final months of the 1988–89 season was disastrous and they slumped to 20th place in the final table. Gregory left during 1989–90 and Frank Burrows returned for a second spell. Initially, he was able to stabilize the club and secure a mid-table finish, but the 1990–91 season proved to be a poor one and Burrows was sacked in March 1991 with the club in serious danger of relegation. Some good form under caretaker manager Tony Barton was enough to secure safety for another season, although he declined to take up the job on a permanent basis owing to health concerns.

Jim Smith's arrival as manager in the summer of 1991, combined with the emergence of some good young players, sparked a revival in the team's fortunes and that year Pompey reached the semi-finals of the FA Cup, losing on penalties to eventual winners Liverpool after a replay. The following season, Pompey missed out on promotion to the newly formed FA Premier League only by virtue of having scored one less goal than West Ham United.

Chairman Gregory now called in the money he had lent the club over preceding seasons, and so players were sold with little funds available to buy replacements. The team's form declined, and Smith was controversially sacked in March 1995 and replaced by Terry Fenwick. Relegation to Division Two was avoided on the last day of the 1995–96 season (on goal difference) when Pompey won away to Huddersfield Town while other results went the club's way.

In the summer of 1996, Terry Venables arrived at Pompey as a consultant, later taking over as chairman after buying the club for £1. The team enjoyed a run to the quarter-finals of the FA Cup in 1996–97, beating FA Premier League side Leeds United in the process, but finished seventh (just short of the qualifying places for the play-offs for promotion to the Premier League). The 1997–98 season saw Venables lose his popularity with the club's supporters, as he signed several Australian players, whose form was mostly disappointing, while his role as coach of the Australian national team meant he was frequently absent from Portsmouth. Meanwhile, the team's results were poor. Two-thirds of the way through the season, he and unpopular manager Fenwick left the club, Venables selling his shareholding back to Martin Gregory, son of former chairman Jim, while Alan Ball returned as manager. Relegation was again avoided on the last day of the season.

== Portsmouth City Football Club Limited (1999–2010) ==
Pompey's centenary season, 1998–99, saw a serious financial crisis hit the club, and in December 1998, Portsmouth went into administration. They avoided relegation again that season, and were then saved from closure by new chairman Milan Mandarić, who saved the club with a takeover deal in May 1999, after being recommended the club by his friend George Best. A new parent company for the club was created - Portsmouth City Football Club Limited. The new chairman immediately started investing. Things did not get off to the best start under Mandarić, as Ball was sacked on 9 December 1999 with the club near the bottom of the table. Tony Pulis took over and steered the club to safety, but only lasted ten months at the helm after which he was put on gardening leave (and sacked not long afterwards) due to a poor relationship with Mandarić. Veteran player Steve Claridge stepped up to the manager's seat, and some initial success saw talk of promotion to the Premier League, only for a horrific run of defeats to set in after the new year, resulting in Claridge being dismissed as manager (but retained as a player) and being replaced in March 2001 by Chelsea assistant manager Graham Rix. Rix did not prove an entirely popular appointment, as he had been jailed for a sexual offence two years previously, and the club only survived on the last day of the season when they won their final game and Huddersfield Town lost theirs, keeping Portsmouth up at their expense.

Portsmouth F.C. badge used until 2008.

Over the summer, former West Ham manager Harry Redknapp was appointed director of football, and most observers predicted that the minute results did not swing Rix's way, he would be sacked and replaced by Redknapp. Sure enough, after an early promotion charge degenerated into mid-table mediocrity and Pompey were knocked out of the FA Cup by Third Division side Leyton Orient, Rix lost his job in early 2002, with Redknapp taking over as predicted. Former manager Jim Smith was asked to team up with Redknapp, and while he initially turned the offer down to remain as assistant at Coventry City, he soon arrived at Portsmouth after a change of manager at Coventry saw almost all of the club's coaching staff being dismissed.

=== Pompey win The Football League (second tier) ===
In 2002–03, Harry Redknapp brought in a number of experienced Premier League players, such as Steve Stone, Tim Sherwood and Paul Merson, and combined them with younger, up-and-coming talents such as Gary O'Neil and Matt Taylor and Svetoslav Todorov. Pompey stormed the league, going top of the Division 1 table early in the autumn and they remained top for the rest of the season to comfortably beat their main promotion rivals Leicester City to the 2002–03 Division One championship and eventually win the title by six points and a game to spare, despite a poor run of form in the closing stages of the season. Striker Svetoslav Todorov scored 26 league goals, which made him the First Division's top scorer at the end of the season. Portsmouth were awarded the Football League First Division Championship trophy for a third time, as the former Football League championship trophy had been demoted in status in 1992-93 (because of the creation of the FA Premier League) and had become the second tier trophy. Portsmouth goalkeeper Shaka Hislop, midfielders Matthew Taylor and Paul Merson earned places in the 2002–03 Division One PFA Team of the Year award.

=== Premier League (2003–2010) and FA Cup success ===
During the summer, several other seasoned veterans, including Patrik Berger and Teddy Sheringham, joined the club on short-term contracts, to lead the team into their first stint in the Premier League. The club were tipped for immediate relegation and surprised many by staying up. During their seven seasons, Pompey produced some surprise results, notably three home wins – including two in consecutive seasons – against Manchester United.

=== 2003–04 season ===
In their FA Premier League-debuting 2003–04 season, Portsmouth had one of the best home records in the League, but poor away form restricted them to a 13th-place finish. Had they been able to match their impressive home form on their travels, then a top-half finish or even a European place could have been achieved. After producing a major shock at the start of the season when they defeated Aston Villa 2–1 in the very first Premier League match of the season, and then routed Bolton Wanderers 4–0 at Fratton Park in their third match, Pompey topped the league, becoming unlikely early season pace-setters. They were then comfortably in mid-table throughout the autumn, during which time they also scored a 1–0 victory over Liverpool and inflicted 6–1 victory at Fratton Park in November 2003 on Leeds, their heaviest ever loss in the Premier League.

Portsmouth had a 1–1 draw against Arsenal at Highbury, when Teddy Sheringham put Pompey ahead before half-time, before a foul on Arsenal's Robert Pires earned them a penalty, which was converted. This signalled the start of a run of 11-straight games without victory for Pompey. There were suggestions, backed by evidence from video replays on the ITV's The Premiership, that Pires may have dived for the penalty, although he has always vehemently maintained his innocence. Nevertheless, this draw marked the first of a horrendous run of results that left the team odds on to be relegated in mid-March.

However, a 1–0 win at home to rivals Southampton, followed by a first FA Premier League away win at Blackburn Rovers' Ewood Park, proved to be the catalyst for a run of form that included a famous 1–0 win over Manchester United in April, with Steve Stone (rejected by Sir Alex Ferguson on a bid to join United less than two years earlier) the scorer in Portsmouth's first win over United in nearly 60 years. This surprise win handed Portsmouth a relegation lifeline, as it lifted them out of the drop-zone for the first time since early February. A 2–1 away win over Leeds and a 1–1 draw at home to Fulham in their next two matches confirmed that Portsmouth would not be relegated in their first Premier League outing. The club signed off their impressive Premier League debut season with a 5–1 crushing of the season's League Cup winners Middlesbrough at Fratton Park on the final day of the season, 15 May.

=== 2004–05 season ===
Despite their successful partnership, Milan Mandarić and Harry Redknapp clashed several times during their time together. At the end of the 2003–04 season, Mandarić was considering replacing some of the club's coaching staff, including Redknapp's assistant, Jim Smith. No changes took place, however, and after an uneasy start to the 2004–05 season, failing to win any of their first three matches, two consecutive home wins (4–3 over Fulham and 3–1 over Crystal Palace) started a steady run of form (including a famous 2–0 win over Manchester United at Fratton Park in October) that saw them remain comfortably in mid-table between August and December.

Despite the team's achievements on the pitch, however, behind the scenes all was not well. The two clashed again more seriously when Mandarić proposed appointing another director in November, with responsibility for the youth set-up at the club. Redknapp disapproved of the proposal, but Mandarić pressed ahead and appointed Velimir Zajec. Redknapp, along with his assistant Jim Smith, subsequently resigned with immediate effect on 23 November.

Zajec took over as manager, initially as caretaker, then on 20 December 2004 the club announced that he would manage the team for the remainder of the season. Their first game under Zajec was a 1–0 away win over Bolton in a hard-fought match where Portsmouth captain Arjan de Zeeuw and Bolton striker El Hadji Diouf had an on-pitch skirmish in the second-half that later prompted Diouf to spit in De Zeeuw's face. This victory lifted Portsmouth into the top half of the table for the first time since August. On 7 April 2005, however, after a poor run of results which saw Portsmouth fall away from as high as ninth place on Boxing Day to 15th position in the table by the end of March, Alain Perrin was appointed team manager, with Zajec reverting to his director's role.

After having looked in real danger of relegation for most of the second half of the season, Portsmouth's 4–1 victory at home to local rivals Southampton on 24 April brought the club close to securing Premier League survival which became virtually certain six days later when, although Pompey lost 2–0 at Manchester City, two clubs lower in the table also failed to win their matches, leaving Portsmouth needing only a single point from their two remaining games to make survival certain. A week later, the club made sure of their safety with a 1–1 home draw against Bolton in their penultimate game of the season. With relegation rivals Crystal Palace and Southampton drawing their match 2–2 on the same day, this result meant that, regardless of the result of their match on the final day, Portsmouth could not finish lower than 16th place (eventually their final position).

On 15 May, the final day of the season, Portsmouth's 2–0 defeat at West Bromwich Albion gave Albion survival and relegated Southampton, resulting in a carnival atmosphere at the end of the match which saw both sets of fans invade the pitch. The 2005–06 season thus saw Portsmouth play in a higher league than rivals Southampton for the first time since 1960.

Yakubu, Pompey's main goal threat for the past two-and-a-half seasons, was sold to Middlesbrough for £7.5 million and several other players were transferred as Alain Perrin began to stamp his authority on the club. After many years of waiting, plans emerged for a redevelopment of Fratton Park itself, the aim being to turn a dilapidated, old style league ground into a 21st-century, 30,000-capacity stadium. Off the field, changes also occurred with the departure of director of football Velimir Zajec, for personal reasons.

=== 2005–06 season ===
Portsmouth continued to struggle in the 2005–06 season, winning just two games between August and November, a 1–0 victory over Everton at Goodison Park (courtesy of an own goal by Everton's Duncan Ferguson) and a 4–1 away win over Sunderland at the Stadium of Light. During a hard-fought 1–0 defeat to Bolton at Reebok Stadium in early October, Alain Perrin's continual harassment of the match officials saw him ordered away from the pitchside by the referee, an incident that landed Perrin in hot water with The Football Association (FA) and also led many pundits to believe his demise was now only a matter of time. The club's series of poor results (that set a record low number of points for a Portsmouth manager) continued into December 2005, at which time Milan Mandarić finally reached the end of his tether, sacking Perrin.

Former manager Harry Redknapp took charge again a couple of weeks later, leaving south coast rivals Southampton. The appointment made headlines on the sports pages of the UK press, with fans divided into strong pro and anti-Redknapp camps. Unusual betting patterns shortly before Redknapp left Southampton resulted in the club and Redknapp himself being investigated by the FA. After months of investigation, no charges followed. The return of Redknapp to the club lifted morale for Portsmouth, and in late December 2005 they finally scored their first victory at Fratton Park since April with a 1–0 success over relegation rivals West Brom, following it up with a 1–1 home draw against an in-form West Ham side. Those two games and a 1–1 draw against Fulham lifted Portsmouth from 19th to 16th in the table, but soon after Portsmouth fell back into the relegation zone.

In January 2006, Milan Mandarić confirmed he was to sell a stake in the club to Franco-Russian businessman Alexandre Gaydamak, and a cash injection of a reported £15 million enabled Portsmouth to purchase Benjani from French side Auxerre for a club record £4.1 million, as well as Sean Davis, Pedro Mendes and Noé Pamarot, in addition to Wayne Routledge and Andrés D'Alessandro on loan.

It appeared that this new cash injection, the return of Redknapp to the club and the arrival of several new players would be too little too late for Portsmouth, as at the beginning of March 2006 they were 12 points adrift from safety with ten matches left.

When their chief relegation rivals Birmingham City thrashed Portsmouth 5–0 – their heaviest defeat to date in the Premier League at the time, and also their sixth consecutive match without scoring a goal – Portsmouth looked certain to be relegated and the result also seemed to have put both Birmingham and West Brom out of Pompey's reach. Despite a valiant effort, the club were unable to repeat their home success against Manchester United for a third consecutive season, losing their tilt at Fratton Park 3–1.

A late equaliser by on-loan Azar Karadas in a 1–1 home draw against Bolton ended Portsmouth's run of seven defeats in a row and earned them a crucial point from a match that, had they lost, would have virtually ended any hopes of survival that season. However, it was not until a last-minute winning goal by Pedro Mendes at home to Manchester City two weeks later that a dramatic change in form and fortunes was sparked during March and April, which coincided with a loss of form for both Birmingham and West Brom. After gaining 17 points from 8 games, Portsmouth avoided relegation on 29 April when a win in the penultimate game of the season at Wigan Athletic, combined with Birmingham's failure to beat Newcastle United, put Portsmouth beyond the pursuit of the Premier League's bottom three sides.

On 19 July 2006, co-owner and club chairman Milan Mandarić transferred full ownership of the club over to Alexandre Gaydamak after a seven-year tenure that saw Portsmouth rise from the brink of liquidation into the top tier of domestic football. Mandarić remained at the club as non-executive chairman until 25 September before taking over Championship club Leicester City.

During the summer transfer window, England internationals Glen Johnson (on a one-season loan from Chelsea), David James and Sol Campbell were signed, as well as former under-21 midfielder David Thompson. Thompson, however, departed for Bolton in February 2007, but James and Campbell both stayed at Portsmouth. Veteran strikers Nwankwo Kanu and Andy Cole were brought in on short-term contracts, with midfielders Manuel Fernandes and Roudolphe Douala joining on loan. Serbian international midfielder Ognjen Koroman's loan from Russian club Terek Grozny was extended for a further season, although he left the club in January 2007. Pompey's most expensive signing of the transfer window was that of Croatia international Niko Kranjčar, who cost £3.5 million from Hajduk Split.

=== 2006–07 season ===
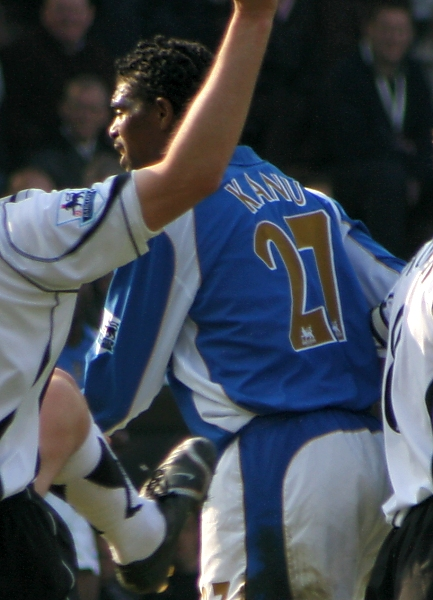
Nwankwo Kanu signed for Portsmouth for free before the 2006–07 season and ended the season as the club's top scorer

Portsmouth made a strong start to the 2006–07 Premier League campaign without conceding any goals in their first five games and were briefly top of the League table. Two defeats in a row to Bolton (1–0 at home) and Tottenham Hotspur (2–1 at White Hart Lane) dented this record, but the team continued to make progress and build on their strong start so that at Christmas they still occupied fourth place (only a point behind third-placed Bolton). This prompted speculation that the club might emulate the achievements of former Premier League strugglers Bolton, Everton and Middlesbrough by qualifying for the UEFA Cup or even the UEFA Champions League, though Manchester United and Chelsea's excellent early-season form meant that neither Bolton and Portsmouth, nor any other Premier League sides, were considered serious title challengers by this stage. A run of poorer results after Christmas, however, moved Portsmouth down towards mid-table, effectively ending their hopes of qualifying for the UEFA Cup.

Nevertheless, Portsmouth could still take many positives from their 2006–07 campaign, not least the fact that they had never, at any stage of the season, looked to be in danger of relegation, largely due to their massive improvement in away game form compared with their three previous Premier League outings and also that their home form had remained consistently strong. Additionally, there were also many encouraging results for the club, including victories over Manchester United, Everton, Reading, Newcastle and Liverpool. By the end of the season, they had amassed 54 points from 38 games (their best-ever achievement in the Premier League and their most successful finish to a season in over five decades) and recovered from their mid-season slump to finish a respectable ninth in the final table, much higher than many pundits had predicted before the season started. Portsmouth, however, declined to participate in the UEFA Intertoto Cup 2007, preferring to honour a commitment they had made to play in the 2007 Premier League Asia Trophy in Hong Kong with Liverpool, Fulham and South China AA between 24 and 27 July, dates which clashed with Intertoto ties.

On 21 May 2007, Canterbury of New Zealand announced a deal to make the kit for Portsmouth. This was the company's first venture into football.

=== 2007–08 season: FA Cup glory ===
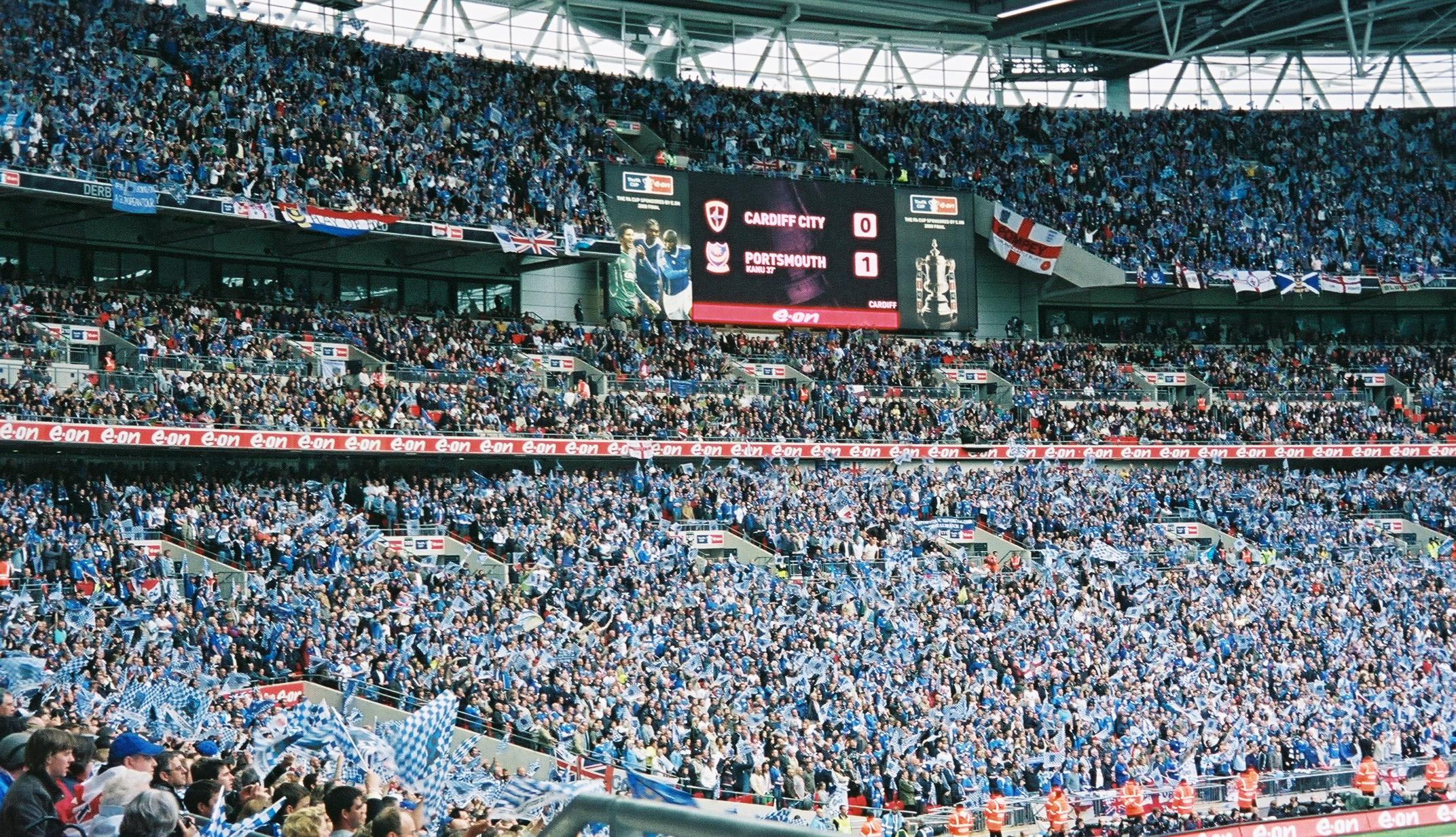
Scoreboard at the end of the 2008 FA Cup Final

Portsmouth's progress continued into 2007–08, with the club enjoying their best season for over 50 years, starting on a good note after a 1–0 victory over Fulham and a penalty shootout win over Liverpool saw them clinch the Asia Trophy, prevailing 4–2 over Liverpool after the match had ended in a goalless draw. Two Premier League draws with newly promoted Derby County and reigning champions Manchester United preserved their unbeaten start to the season before they scored their first league victory with a 3–1 success over Bolton at Fratton Park on 18 August. After winning none of their next three games, Portsmouth dropped to 17th in the table, just above the relegation zone, but a 1–0 win over Blackburn at Ewood Park on 23 September secured them their first away win of the season and began a club record run of ten league games without defeat.

On 29 September 2007, Portsmouth beat Reading 7–4 at Fratton Park in the highest scoring match in Premier League history. This result lifted the South Coast club up to sixth place in the table at the start of October 2007. A 4–1 away win over on 3 November over Newcastle helped them climb to fourth, although a poor run of results around Christmas dropped them back to eight in the table by mid-January, four points adrift of a UEFA Cup slot. A consistent run of results followed after Christmas, lifting them to sixth in the table a month from the end of the season, but Portsmouth's failure to win any of their last four league games restricted them to an eighth-place finish. Nevertheless, this was their highest league placing for 53 years and, having scored 57 points from their 38 league games, set another new record for the club tipped as relegation certainties only two years earlier.

On 8 March 2008, Portsmouth reached the semi-finals of the FA Cup for the first time in 16 years with a 1–0 away win over tournament favourites Manchester United in the quarter-final, their first victory at Old Trafford since 1957. Portsmouth earned a penalty from a professional foul by Tomasz Kuszczak, who was consequently sent off. As United had made all their substitutions, with Kuszczak being one of them after starter Edwin van der Sar's injury, centre-back Rio Ferdinand stepped into goal but could not prevent Sulley Muntari from scoring the penalty. The result saw them book a place in a fixture at Wembley Stadium for the first time since claiming the trophy back in 1939. A 1–0 victory over West Brom in their semi-final on 5 April 2008, the club's 110th birthday, saw Portsmouth into their first post-war FA Cup final.

On 17 May 2008, Portsmouth won the FA Cup after beating Cardiff City at Wembley with a 1–0 victory in the final, thus securing qualification for the 2008–09 UEFA Cup. This was the first time that the club had ever qualified for a European competition, with the club's glory years occurring prior to the establishment of the European Cup.

=== 2008–09 season: Financial crisis begins ===
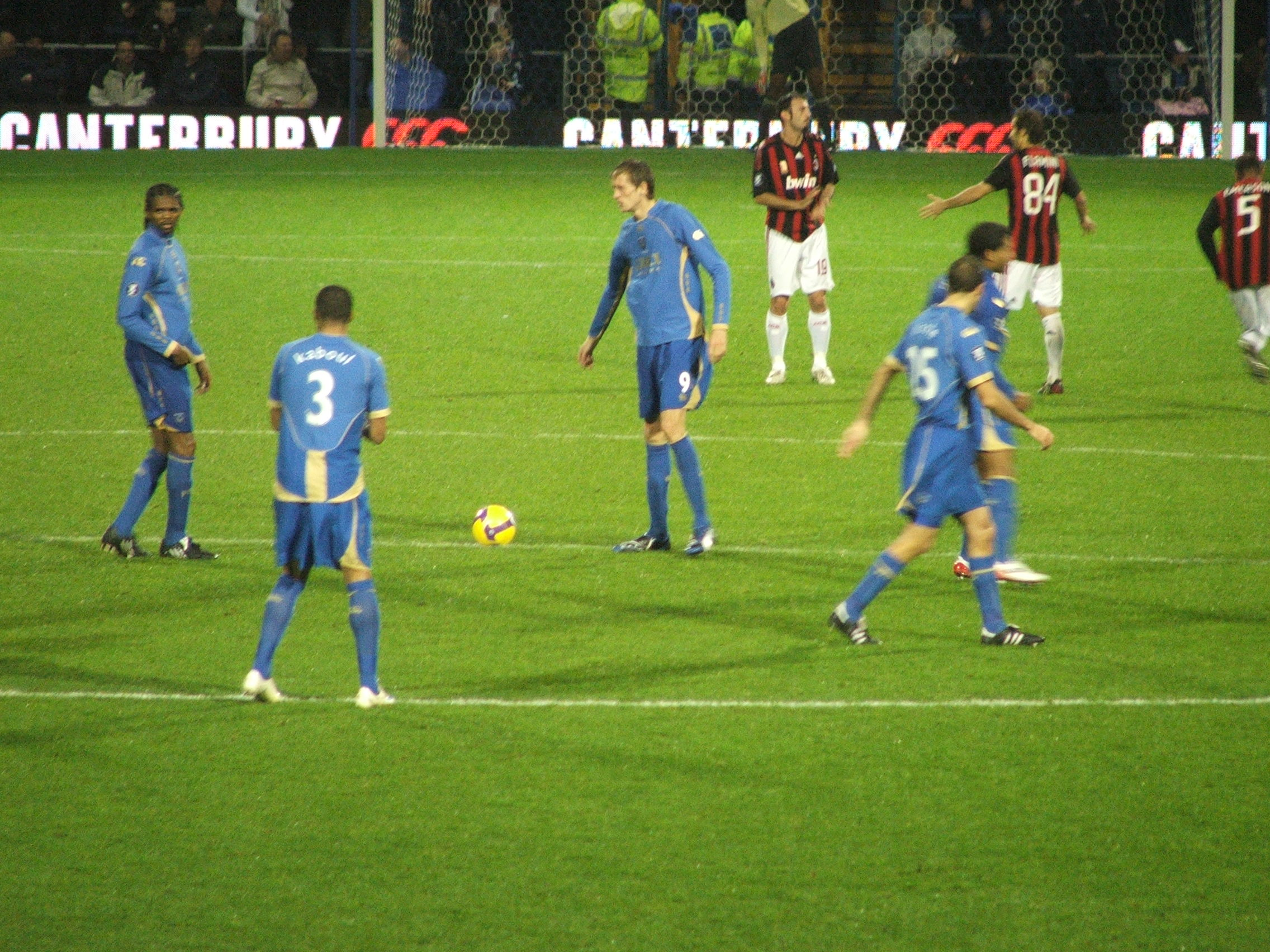
Portsmouth playing Milan in the UEFA Cup, with players including Nwankwo Kanu, Peter Crouch and Younès Kaboul

Portsmouth began their 2008–09 season with a defeat to Manchester United in the 2008 FA Community Shield on 10 August 2008 at Wembley, losing 3–1 on penalties to the reigning Premier League champions after the match had ended 0–0. The Premier League season got off to a similarly poor start as they were convincingly beaten 4–0 in their first league match, away to Chelsea, while a hard-fought 1–0 defeat to Manchester United at Fratton Park in their second saw them drop to the foot of the table in the last week of August. The South Coast club, however, made amends for this poor start with a 3–0 away win against Everton which lifted them out of the drop zone at the start of September. On 21 September, Portsmouth suffered their heaviest defeat to date in the Premier League when they lost 6–0 away at Manchester City, but they remained 13th in the table. They eventually finished in 14th place, thanks to academy director Paul Hart stepping in as caretaker boss, seven points clear of the relegated clubs, despite the disruption brought by the departure of Harry Redknapp and the subsequent sacking of his successor, former assistant manager Tony Adams.

At the start of the 2008–09 season rumours began to fly around that Portsmouth were facing crippling debts due to their recent heavy spending and owner Alexandre Gaydamak was looking to sell the club. After Redknapp's departure many key players began to depart with Lassana Diarra and Jermain Defoe leaving in January. In May 2009, Sulaiman Al-Fahim had a takeover big accepted for the club. However, the takeover dragged on over the whole summer, and with no money being put into the club, the majority of the squad had to be sold, with the likes of Peter Crouch, Glen Johnson and Sylvain Distin sold for big money fees. With no incoming players, meanwhile, Portsmouth quickly became favourites for relegation. Al-Fahim finally took the club over in August and a few players, such as Tommy Smith, Aruna Dindane and Jamie O'Hara, were brought in. However, there was constant speculation that Al-Fahim did not have enough money to run the club and manage the £70 million debt.

=== 2009–10 season: the crisis worsens and relegation ===
This came to a head when September's wages were not paid on time, whereupon the club was once again taken over, this time by Saudi Arabian businessman Ali Al-Faraj. By this time, the team were, as expected, languishing at the bottom of the table, and Avram Grant was brought in as director of football. As poor results continued, however, Paul Hart was sacked and Grant took over as manager. Al-Faraj, however, did not seem to bring what was promised; he never attended Portsmouth matches and again club wages were not paid on time for all of December, January and February. Portsmouth were also issued with a winding up order due to unpaid taxes. Other problems arose, with the official club website closed due to the provider not being paid, Sol Campbell suing the club for unpaid image rights and the Premier League withholding Pompey's TV money and paying it to the clubs to whom money was owed. Portsmouth's relegation then saw Grant depart the club after being offered the manager position at West Ham. The following is the open letter from Grant published on Portsmouth's official club website:

"Portsmouth has given me a feeling of home away from home. I might be leaving Portsmouth physically, but you cannot take Portsmouth away from me and my heart. It's been both a difficult and complex year for us at the club, but, at the same time, it's been a wonderful and uplifting professional and personal experience. I have been inundated with letters and emails from fans. Many have brought tears to my eyes - and, take it from me, it takes a lot to do that.I will never forget you, the loyal fans of Pompey, who, without a doubt, helped me protect the team under such complex circumstances. There are very few teams in the world that have fans as passionate and devoted as you are. Seeing you all so proud with your heads held up high is the best reward I can receive."

== Portsmouth Football Club (2010) Limited (2010–2013) ==
=== Portsmouth in the Championship (2010–2012) ===
The 2010–11 season was Portsmouth's first season in The Championship (previously "Division One" from 1992-2004, and "Second Division" 1888-1992) after they were relegated from the Premier League during the 2009–10 season. Steve Cotterill was appointed Portsmouth manager on 18 June 2010, enduring a tough summer of player sales with little or no money available for replacements. On 22 October, Portsmouth issued a statement saying, "It appears likely that the club will now be closed down and liquidated by the administrators," but Pompey's creditor, Alexandre Gaydamak, announced the next day that he had reached an agreement that could save their future. It was revealed just hours later that Portsmouth had finally come out of administration and had been bought by Conver's Sports Initiatives headed by Vladamir Antonov, with Portsmouth owned under a new company named Portsmouth Football Club (2010) Limited. The future appeared secured and Portsmouth went on to finish in 16th position with 58 points and a goal difference of –7 from 15 wins, 13 draws and 18 losses, a solid finish considering that they had one of the smallest squads in the Championship.

=== Relegations to League One and Two ===
Appleton commented that he may lose up to 18 players of his current squad in the 2012 summer transfer window as the club adapted to life back in League One. On 4 May, Portsmouth defender Jason Pearce joined Leeds United for a fee around £500,000, being the first player to leave the club. Next to leave was trainee Joel Ward, who joined Crystal Palace for a fee around £400,000, which followed by Stephen Henderson joining West Ham and Kelvin Etuhu joining Barnsley. Soon, Hayden Mullins and Aaron Mokoena were both to leave Portsmouth and joined Birmingham City and Wits University respectively.

On 18 May 2012, Balram Chainrai's Portpin proposed terms for a CVA that would enable Portsmouth to come out of administration, providing creditors agree to the proposal. One of the proposed terms was reported to be an offer of 2 pence in the pound. Meanwhile, the Pompey Supporters Trust said they would be making a rival bid for the club, offering a better deal than 2p in the pound to creditors in their CVA proposal, which was later approved.

On 25 June 2012, Portsmouth's creditors announced that they favoured Balram Chainrai's proposal over the Pompey Supporters Trust's. Chainrai had 28 days to make good on the proposal and start the process of bringing the club out of administration. If Chainrai took Portsmouth over, the PST could do a deal with him directly to buy the club. Professional Footballers' Association chief executive Gordon Taylor said Portsmouth's players needed to reach a compromise on wages to save the club. Among those players who were high-earning players were Tal Ben Haim, Nwankwo Kanu, Liam Lawrence, Hayden Mullins, Erik Huseklepp, Luke Varney, Greg Halford and David Norris. Instead, the club transfer listed the high-earning players in order to cut costs at Portsmouth.

Portsmouth were due to start the 2012–13 season on −10 points after being told by the Football League that they were allowed into League One with strict financial controls, which administrator Trevor Birch described as "unjustified", although this penalty has yet to be applied. Soon after the Football League's decision, Trevor Birch said Balram Chainrai's bid proposal was being withdrawn due to other imposed financial conditions. The Pompey Supporters Trust said its bid to buy Portsmouth was "ongoing" and had welcomed news that land surrounding Fratton Park could be up for sale.

On 25 July 2012, it was announced on Portsmouth's website that the club was likely to have no alternative but to close (possibly go defunct) on 10 August unless the remaining senior first-team players agreed to transfers or signed wage compromise deals. On 27 July, Halford was the first of those transfers to leave the club, joining Nottingham Forest. The second, meanwhile, was Erik Huseklepp, who moved to Norwegian side SK Brann on 28 July; the third was Dave Kitson, who left on 3 August; the fourth was Tal Ben Haim, who left on 9 August; and last to leave was Lawrence, who did so on 10 August. This meant that the club would now survive, allowing the takeover process to continue. Chainrai then cancelled his offer, leaving the PST's offer as the only one remaining. However, he re-submitted the bid on 23 August 2012 and on the next day the PST announced that it was on track to submit a business plan and revised offer.

On 18 October 2012, the administrators named the Pompey Supporters Trust as its preferred bidder after rumours that the Football League had raised concerns over Chanrai's bid. On 7 November 2012, it was confirmed that Michael Appleton would leave Portsmouth to become the manager of Blackpool, along with first-team coach Ashley Westwood. The club confirmed that Guy Whittingham would take over as caretaker manager. On 9 November, Chanrai halted his attempt to buy the club. Six days later, PST signed an initial conditional agreement with PFK to buy the club.

== Portsmouth Community Football Club Limited (2013–present) ==
The Pompey Supporters Trust became the new owners of the club on 10 April 2013 after the club exited administration, with the parent company now officially named as Portsmouth Community Football Club Limited. On the pitch, Portsmouth went on to be relegated from League One at the end of the 2012–13 season after going 23 games without a win, however the Football League still agreed to deduct the ten points from Portsmouth for going into administration, despite them already being relegated.

Portsmouth were tipped for promotion from League Two by the bookmakers, with Guy Whittingham given the first team job full-time. However, after a slow start to the season, Whittingham became increasingly unpopular. He was sacked on 25 November 2013 with Portsmouth just six points above the relegation zone. Andy Awford took the role of caretaker manager, earning a point against Hartlepool United in his first game, but the permanent job was given to Ritchie Barker, who took over a Portsmouth side in 17th place on 9 December. However, Portsmouth's form worsened under Barker and on 27 March 2014, he was sacked after just 20 games with the team just two points above the relegation zone. Awford once again stepped in as caretaker manager to be in charge of what was billed as "seven cup finals" to save the club. Portsmouth won five of them in a row and drew the other two, finishing 13th. Andy Awford's impressive run of results earned him the role of Portsmouth's first-team manager for the 2014–15 season.

On a historic announcement on 29 September 2014, the club was able to declare itself debt-free after paying back all creditors and legacy payments to ex-players. The news came 18 months after the PST took control of the club. Following an unsuccessful 2014–15 season, Paul Cook was appointed new manager of Portsmouth on 12 May 2015.

Paul Cook led Portsmouth to a play-off spot in the 2015–16 season after a 2–0 away win at Hartlepool United on 30 April 2016, but lost to Plymouth Argyle in the semi-final. In the 2016–17 season, Paul Cook's side secured promotion to League One with a 3–1 win away at Notts County on 17 April 2017. On 6 May, the final match of the season, Portsmouth topped the table (for the first time in the season) following the 6–1 home win against Cheltenham and were crowned champions of League Two. Paul Cook resigned on 31 May 2017 to join Wigan Athletic. Kenny Jackett was appointed the new manager on 2 June 2017. In May the Pompey Supporters' Trust (PST) voted in favour of a proposed bid by The Tornante Company, headed by former Disney chief executive Michael Eisner, to take over Portsmouth Community Football Club Limited which was completed on 3 August 2017.

=== EFL League One and EFL Championship (2017 to present) ===
On 15 March 2018, the club revealed a newly redesigned club crest, featuring a new nautical compass star and an "1898" date, added for the founding year of the football club. The new crest will be introduced for the new 2018-19 season. Portsmouth ended the 2017–18 season in 8th position, missing the play-off places by 5 points.

Portsmouth remained undefeated in the 2018–19 EFL League One campaign for eleven consecutive league matches. On 31 March 2019, Portsmouth met Sunderland in the 2019 EFL Trophy final at Wembley Stadium. The match finished 1–1 after normal time, 2–2 after 30 minutes of extra time. A penalty shootout followed, with Portsmouth winning 5–4 on penalties. Portsmouth's regular EFL League One season concluded on 4 May 2019, with the team finishing 4th and qualifying for the League One play-offs. In the play-off semi-finals, Portsmouth were met by fifth placed Sunderland, losing 1–0 on aggregate.

During the 2019–20 season, Portsmouth achieved a run of winning nine consecutive matches in all competitions, setting a new club win record since Portsmouth joined the Football League in 1920. On 18 February 2020, Portsmouth qualified for the 2020 EFL Trophy final after narrowly defeating Exeter City 3–2 in the semi-final at Fratton Park, setting up the final with Salford City. On 13 March 2020, all professional football in England was suspended (until at least 30 April) due to the global COVID-19 coronavirus pandemic. On 9 June 2020, the football clubs of EFL League One (and EFL League Two) voted to end the season early on a points-per-game calculation, which resulted with Coventry City as League One champions and Rotherham United as League One runners-up. Portsmouth were awarded a fifth place finish to earn one of the four promotion play-off places for the EFL Championship, and were matched with Oxford United in a two-legged semi-final behind closed doors. After a 1–1 draw in each leg, Oxford won 5–4 on penalties.

COVID-19 'social-distancing' restrictions were partially relaxed in December 2020 when 2,000 Portsmouth fans were permitted to return to Fratton Park on 5 December 2000 for the EFL League One game against Peterborough United. After a promising start to the season, Portsmouth dropped to mid-table by March 2021 after a poor run of form. Due to COVID-19 lockdowns, the much-delayed 2019–20 EFL Trophy final was finally played behind closed doors at Wembley Stadium on 13 March 2021, with Portsmouth losing 4–2 on penalties to Salford City after ending 0–0 after extra time. It was to be Kenny Jackett's last game as Portsmouth manager, as the club announced his departure on 14 March 2021. On 19 March 2020, Danny Cowley was appointed head coach until the end of the season. By early May 2020 and with 45 league games played, Portsmouth were in sixth position with one game to play, needing to win their last game to guarantee a play-off place. However, Portsmouth lost to Accrington Stanley and results went against them elsewhere, meaning they missed out.

Portsmouth ended their 2021–22 season on 30 April 2022 in 10th position with a total of 73 points, missing out on the play-off positions by 10 points. Despite the promising start to the campaign, a dismal run of just one win in fourteen league games led to Portsmouth parting ways with manager Danny Cowley on 2 January 2023, with the club in 12th place. John Mousinho was appointed as head coach on a long-term contract. Portsmouth ended the 2022–23 season in 8th with 70 points, seven points below the play-offs.

In the 2023–24 season, Portsmouth started the season brightly. On 25 November 2023, they were defeated by Blackpool which was Pompey's first league defeat in 27 matches. At the end of the season, Portsmouth were promoted as champions, ending their 12-year stay below the second tier.

Portsmouth's 2024–25 Championship season was a mixed season of away defeats and home wins, resulting in a 16th position ending, 54 points and avoiding relegation by 5 points.
