= Tom Galley =

English footballer

Personal information
- Full name: Thomas Galley
- Date of birth: 4 August 1915
- Place of birth: Hednesford, England
- Date of death: 13th June 1999
- Place of death: Great Wyrley, England
- Position: Forward

Youth career
- Cannock Town
- Notts County

Senior career*
Years	Team	Apps	(Gls)
1933–1947	Wolverhampton Wanderers	183	(41)
1947–1949	Grimsby Town	32	(2)
1949–1950	Kidderminster Harriers		

International career
1937	England	2	(1)
- * Club domestic league appearances and goals

Thomas Galley (4 August 1915 – 12 July 2000) was an English international footballer, who spent the majority of his league career with Wolverhampton Wanderers.

== Career ==
Galley joined Wolverhampton Wanderers in 1933, signing professionally the following year before making his league debut on 5 January 1935 in a goalless draw at Sunderland.

He established himself in the second half of the 1935–36 season and the next campaign saw him score 16 times, his best-ever seasonal tally. A versatile attacker, he occupied many different positions over his 14-year stay at Molineux.

During the war, he served in France and Germany with the Royal Artillery, and guested for Aldershot, Leeds and Watford. Either side of the conflict, he was a regular player in the Wolves side, forming a prolific forward line with Dennis Westcott and appearing in the 1939 FA Cup Final and 1942 War Cup Final.

Galley won two England caps during his Wolves career, making a goalscoring debut against Norway on 14 May 1937, and winning a second and final cap three days later against Sweden.

He moved to Grimsby Town in November 1947, where he became captain, before later moving on to Kidderminster Harriers.

== Honours ==
Wolverhampton Wanderers

- FA Cup runner-up: 1938–39
