= Thomas Roe (disambiguation) =

Thomas Roe was an English diplomat.

Thomas Roe may also refer to:

- Thomas Roe, 1st Baron Roe (1832–1923), British businessman and Liberal politician
- Tommy Roe (born 1942), singer-songwriter
- Tommy Roe (footballer) (1900–1972), English footballer
- Thomas A. Roe (1927–2000), American businessman and conservative philanthropist

== See also ==
- Thomas Rowe (disambiguation)
