= Joseph Gardiner =

Joseph Gardiner may refer to:

- Joseph Gardiner (Western Australian politician) (1886–1965), member of the Western Australian Legislative Assembly
- Joseph Gardiner (New South Wales politician) (1879–1941), member of the New South Wales Legislative Council
- Joe Gardiner, English footballer
