= Alex Scott (footballer, born 1913) =

English footballer

Personal information
- Full name: Robert Alexander Scott
- Date of birth: 29 October 1913
- Place of birth: Liverpool, England
- Date of death: 1962 (aged 48–49)
- Height: 6 ft 4 in (1.93 m)
- Position: Goalkeeper

Youth career
- 1930–1933: Liverpool

Senior career*
| Years | Team | Apps | (Gls) |
| 1933–1936 | Burnley | 65 | (0) |
| 1936–1947 | Wolverhampton Wanderers | 110 | (0) |
| 1947–1949 | Crewe Alexandra | 44 | (0) |
- * Club domestic league appearances and goals

Robert Alexander Scott (29 October 1913 – 1962) was an English football goalkeeper, who spent most of his career with Wolverhampton Wanderers.

== Career ==
Scott began his career as a groundsman at his hometown club Liverpool, but was unable to break into the first team. He left in search of playing opportunities at Burnley in 1933 and spent three seasons with the Clarets.

In February 1936 he moved to Wolverhampton Wanderers for £1,250, and quickly became first choice at Molineux, making his debut on 8 February 1936 in a goalless draw with Derby County. Scott gained an FA Cup runners-up medal in 1939 as the club lost the FA Cup final to Portsmouth. He also twice finished a runner-up in the league (in 1937–38 and 1938–39).

The outbreak of World War II saw the suspension of league football. Scott still managed to play 85 times for Wolves in Wartime and turned out as a guest for both Aston Villa and Southport in friendlies, while also serving as a policeman.

However, the resumption of league football saw the end of Scott's time with Wolves, as they opted for Bert Williams to take over as first choice goalkeeper. Scott moved onto Crewe Alexandra in August 1947, playing two seasons in the Second Division before retiring from the game.

After ending his football career, he ran a general store in Wolverhampton and later served in the local police force before his death in 1962.

== Honours ==
Wolverhampton Wanderers

- FA Cup runner-up: 1938–39
