= Alex McIntosh =

Alex McIntosh may refer to:

- Alex McIntosh (footballer) (1916–1965), Scottish footballer
- Alex McIntosh (footballer, born 1923) (1923-1998), Scottish footballer, full back for Inverurie Loco, Dundee, Barrow and Carlisle United
- Alex McIntosh (bowls) (1936–2008), Scottish lawn bowler
- Alex McIntosh (politician) (1934–2023), Canadian politician

== See also ==
- Alex Macintosh (1925–1997), BBC presenter and continuity announcer
