= Teddy Maguire =

English footballer

Personal information
- Full name: James Edward Maguire
- Date of birth: 23 July 1917
- Place of birth: Meadowfield, County Durham, England
- Date of death: 1990 (aged 72–73)
- Position: Winger

Senior career*
Years	Team	Apps	(Gls)
- Willington
1936–1947	Wolverhampton Wanderers	79	(9)
1947–1948	Swindon Town	28	(4)
1948–1950	Halifax Town	55	(8)
- Spennymoor United
- * Club domestic league appearances and goals

James Edward Maguire (23 July 1917 – 1990) was an English footballer, who spent the majority of his career with Wolverhampton Wanderers.

== Career ==
Maguire moved into league football Wolverhampton Wanderers from non-league Willington in his native County Durham in 1936. He made his league debut on 14 November 1936 in a 1–2 loss at Stoke City, one of 14 appearances in his first season.

He became a first choice player the following season, as the club finished runners-up in the league. The following year brought Maguire close to silverware again but Wolves ultimately finished as runner-up in both the league and FA Cup.

He remained on the club's books during the break from competitive football caused by World War II, but never played an official game for them post-war. In May 1947, he signed for Swindon Town, where he remained for 15 months before ending his league career with a spell at Halifax Town.

He died in 1990.

== Honours ==
Wolverhampton Wanderers

- FA Cup runner-up: 1938–39
