= Thomas Rowe (disambiguation) =

Thomas Rowe (1829–1899) was an architect, politician, and volunteer in the defence force in the colony of New South Wales.

Thomas Rowe or Tom Rowe may also refer to:

== Sport ==
- Tom Rowe (cricketer) (born 1993), plays for Nottinghamshire
- Tom Rowe (footballer) (1920–2003), Australian rules footballer for Hawthorn
- Tom Rowe (ice hockey) (born 1956), American ice hockey player and coach
- Tom Rowe (rugby union) (born 1991), New Zealand rugby union player
- Tommy Rowe (born 1988), English football player for Stockport, Peterborough and Wolves
- Tommy Rowe (footballer, born 1913) (1913–2006), English football player for Portsmouth

== Others ==
- Thomas Rowe (Don CeSar), founder of the Don CeSar Hotel in St. Petersburg Beach, Florida
- Thomas Rowe (mayor), Lord Mayor of London in 1568
- Thomas Rowe (tutor) (1657–1705), English nonconformist minister
- Tom Rowe (musician) (1950–2004), bass player

== See also ==
- Thomas Roe (disambiguation)
