= Harry Walker (footballer) =

English footballer

Personal information
- Full name: George Henry Walker
- Date of birth: 20 May 1916
- Place of birth: Aysgarth, England
- Date of death: 9 January 1976 (aged 59)
- Place of death: Beeston, England
- Height: 1.75 m (5 ft 9 in)
- Position: Goalkeeper

Senior career*
Years	Team	Apps	(Gls)
1934–1938	Darlington	50	(0)
1938–1947	Portsmouth	49	(0)
1947–?	Leeds United	293	(0)
Total		392	(0)
- * Club domestic league appearances and goals

George Henry Walker (20 May 1916 – 9 January 1976) was an English football goalkeeper born in Aysgarth, North Yorkshire, who played in the Football League for Darlington, Portsmouth and Nottingham Forest. He played in the Portsmouth team that beat Wolverhampton Wanderers 4–1 in the 1939 FA Cup Final.

Later Harry worked for a company called Pump and Valve Service, he was a skilled engineer and lived at Beeston, a suburb of Nottingham. He had a wife called Ella. He worked for Pump and Valve Service up until his death and was survived by Ella.

He was 5 ft 9 in (1.75 m) tall.

== Honours ==
Portsmouth

- FA Cup: 1938–39
