= Alex McIntosh (footballer) =

Scottish footballer (1916–1965)

Personal information
- Full name: Alexander McIntosh
- Date of birth: 14 April 1916
- Place of birth: Dunfermline, Scotland
- Date of death: December 1965 (aged 49)
- Place of death: Cannock, England
- Position: Inside forward

Senior career*
| Years | Team | Apps | (Gls) |
| – | Folkestone Town | | |
| 1937–1947 | Wolverhampton Wanderers | 44 | (7) |
| 1947–1948 | Birmingham City | 23 | (4) |
| 1948–1949 | Coventry City | 20 | (3) |
| 1949–19?? | Kidderminster Harriers | | |
- * Club domestic league appearances and goals

Alexander McIntosh (14 April 1916 – December 1965) was a Scottish footballer who played as an inside forward in the Football League for Wolverhampton Wanderers, Birmingham City and Coventry City.

== Career ==
McIntosh moved into league football with Wolverhampton Wanderers from non-league club Folkestone Town in 1937. He made his league debut on 23 October 1937 in a 2-1 win at Leeds United and became a first choice player the following season, which featured a run through to the FA Cup Final, where they lost to underdogs Portsmouth at Wembley.

After the suspension of league football in September 1939 due to the outbreak of the Second World War, McIntosh still turned out for Wolves in wartime fixtures, and was part of their 1942 War Cup victory.

By the resumption of the Football League, he was no longer part of manager Ted Vizard's plans and played just four more times before joining Midlands neighbours Birmingham City in 1947. After a short stay there, he moved on again, joining Coventry City for an equally brief spell.

McIntosh died in Cannock in December 1965, at the age of 49.

== Honours ==
Wolverhampton Wanderers

- FA Cup runner-up: 1938–39

== Sources ==
- Alex McIntosh at Post War English & Scottish Football League A–Z Player's Transfer Database
