= John Eves =

English footballer

Personal information
- Full name: John Robert Eves Also Known As: Bobby Eves
- Date of birth: 28 February 1922
- Place of birth: Sunderland, England
- Date of death: 2007 (aged 84–85)
- Place of death: Sunderland Tyne and Wear
- Position: Full back

Senior career*
Years	Team	Apps	(Gls)
1940–1946	Sunderland	0	(0)
1946–1952	Darlington	177	(1)
- * Club domestic league appearances and goals

John Robert Eves (28 February 1922 – 2007) was an English footballer who made 177 appearances in the Football League playing for Darlington in the years following the Second World War. He played as a full back. Eves began his football career with Sunderland, for whom he made numerous appearances in the wartime competitions, including in the 1942 Football League War Cup Final, but never represented them in post-war senior football.
