= Tommy Rowe (footballer, born 1913) =

English footballer (1913–2006)

Thomas Rowe DFC (13 August 1913 – 9 May 2006) was an English footballer, who played as a centre half. He was a member of the Portsmouth team that beat Wolverhampton Wanderers 4–1 in the 1939 FA Cup Final.

At the outbreak of World War II all meaningful football was suspended for the duration of hostilities, and Tommy initially volunteered for the City of Portsmouth Police. He later joined the RAF and trained as a bomber pilot.

Tommy Rowe flew 39 successful bombing missions over Germany. During this time he rose to the position of squadron leader and was awarded the Distinguished Flying Cross (DFC).

On his 40th bombing mission Tommy Rowe's aircraft was shot down over Germany and Tommy spent the last two years of the war as a prisoner of war.

When peace returned to Europe Tommy Rowe continued to serve with the RAF Volunteer Reserve, finally relinquishing his commission in August 1958.

Rowe died in 2006. He was the last surviving member of Pompey's cup-winning side.

== Honours won ==
- 12 November 1943 - Acting Flight Lieutenant Thomas Rowe (124836), Royal Air Force Volunteer Reserve, No. 77 Squadron RAF was awarded the Distinguished Flying Cross

=== As a player ===
Portsmouth

- FA Cup: 1938–39
