= Joe Gardiner =

English footballer and coach

Personal information
- Date of birth: 23 August 1916
- Place of birth: Bearpark, County Durham, England
- Date of death: 1997 (aged 80–81)
- Place of death: Wolverhampton, England
- Position: Defender

Youth career
- Durham County Boys
- 1932–1933: Wolverhampton Wanderers

Senior career*
Years	Team	Apps	(Gls)
1933–1944	Wolverhampton Wanderers	121	(2)
- * Club domestic league appearances and goals

Joseph Gardiner (23 August 1916 – 1997) was an English footballer, who served Wolverhampton Wanderers as both player and coach.

== Career ==
Gardiner joined Wolverhampton Wanderers in December 1932, signing professionally the following year before making his league debut on 23 February 1935 in a 2–5 loss at Black Country rivals West Bromwich Albion.

He originally joined as a centre-forward but was converted to a centre-back, as he became a first choice player in the seasons preceding World War II. He appeared in the 1939 FA Cup Final for the club, where they lost to Portsmouth in the Wembley showpiece. He also narrowly missed out on glory in the league championship as the club finished runners-up for two successive seasons in the late 1930s.

He remained with the club while the Football League was suspended during wartime, turning out in regional action. He announced his playing retirement in May 1944 but remained on the coaching staff. He was the club's main trainer in the Stan Cullis era as the club became one of the great sides of Europe, winning three league titles and two FA Cups. He was named chief scout in 1966, and helped discover the likes of John Richards.

He died in 1997.

== Honours ==
Wolverhampton Wanderers

- FA Cup runner-up: 1938–39
