= Cliff Whitelum =

English footballer

Cliff Whitelum (2 December 1919 – August 2000) was an English footballer who played for Sunderland as a Forward.

== Club career ==
Whitelum made his debut for Sunderland on 25 January 1939 against Blackpool in a 1–1 draw at Bloomfield Road. Overall, during his Sunderland career spanning from 1939 to 1947, in a stay interrupted largely by the Second World War, made 50 league appearances scoring 19 goals.
