= 1939 FA Cup final =

- Event: 1938–39 FA Cup
Portsmouth	Wolverhampton Wanderers
4	1
- Date: 29 April 1939
- Venue: Wembley Stadium, London
- Referee: T. Thompson
- Attendance: 99,370

The 1939 FA Cup final was contested by Portsmouth and Wolverhampton Wanderers at Wembley. Portsmouth won 4–1, with goals from Bert Barlow, John Anderson and two by Cliff Parker. Dicky Dorsett scored Wolves' effort.

As a result of the suspension of the FA Cup for the duration of the Second World War, the next FA Cup final was not until seven years later in 1946, thereby enabling Portsmouth fans to claim that their team has held the Cup for the longest time.

Wolves had entered the game as clear favourites, having scored 19 goals in their five FA Cup games and lying second in the league table. By contrast, Portsmouth were struggling in the relegation zone.

Captain Jimmy Guthrie was presented with the cup by King George VI. Portsmouth manager Jack Tinn said afterwards that his side won thanks to the help of his "lucky spats".

== Match summary ==
Approaching the half-hour mark, Barlow scored Portsmouth's first goal from within the area. Portsmouth pressed their advantage, refusing to let Wolves back into the contest. Anderson hooked in a second just before half time after McAlinden's chip in from the right had left the advancing Scott in no-man's-land.

Immediately after the restart, Wolves goalkeeper Scott fumbled a shot on the goal line and only prevented the strike creeping in with an outstretched hand on top of the ball. However, Cliff Parker slid in to kick the ball from under the keeper's hand to make it 3–0. Wolves drove forward to try to mount a recovery but a solitary Dorsett strike from eight yards was their only success. Portsmouth put the result beyond any doubt when Parker headed in his second and Portsmouth's fourth from close range from a Worrall cross.

== Additional history ==
When World War II began in September 1939, this caused the 1939 FA Cup champions Portsmouth to hold the distinction of holding the FA Cup trophy for the longest uninterrupted period - seven years - as the FA Cup competition was not held again until the end of World War II. Portsmouth manager Jack Tinn was rumoured to have kept the FA Cup trophy 'safe under his bed' throughout the duration of the war, but this is an urban myth. Because the naval city of Portsmouth was a primary strategic military target for German Luftwaffe bombing, the FA Cup trophy was actually taken ten miles to the north of Portsmouth, to the nearby Hampshire village of Lovedean, and there it resided in a quaint thatched roof country pub called The Bird in Hand for the duration of the war. After the war, the FA Cup trophy was presented back by Portsmouth F.C. to the Football Association in time for the 1946 FA Cup Final.

Portsmouth's Tommy Rowe, who died in May 2006 at the age of 92, was the last surviving player from the 1939 FA Cup Final match.

== Match details ==
29 April 1939
15:00 GMT

Portsmouth	4–1	Wolverhampton Wanderers
Barlow 29'; Anderson 43'; Parker 46', 71'	Report	Dorsett 54'

Empire Stadium, Wembley, London
Attendance: 99,370
Referee: T. Thompson (Lemington, Newcastle upon Tyne)

Portsmouth	Wolverhampton Wanderers

GK	1	(England) Harry Walker
RB	2	(Scotland) Lew Morgan
LB	3	(England) Bill Rochford
RH	4	(Scotland) Jimmy Guthrie (c)
CH	5	(England) Tommy Rowe
LH	6	(England) Guy Wharton
OR	7	(England) Fred Worrall
IR	8	(Northern Ireland) Jimmy McAlinden
CF	9	(Scotland) John Anderson
IL	10	(England) Bert Barlow
OL	11	(England) Cliff Parker
Manager:
(England) Jack Tinn

GK	1	(England) Alec Scott
RB	2	(England) Bill Morris
LB	3	(England) Frank Taylor
RH	4	(England) Tom Galley
CH	5	(England) Stan Cullis (c)
LH	6	(England) Joe Gardiner
OR	7	(England) Stan Burton
IR	8	(Scotland) Alex McIntosh
CF	9	(England) Dennis Westcott
IL	10	(England) Dicky Dorsett
OL	11	(England) Teddy Maguire
Manager:
(England) Major Frank Buckley

Match rules

- 90 minutes.
- 30 minutes of extra-time if necessary.
- Replay if scores still level.

== Road to Wembley ==
=== Portsmouth ===
Round 3: Portsmouth 4–0 Lincoln City

Round 4: Portsmouth 2–0 West Bromwich Albion

Round 5: Portsmouth 2–0 West Ham United

Round 6: Portsmouth 1–0 Preston North End

Semi-Final: Portsmouth 2–1 Huddersfield Town

(at Highbury)

=== Wolverhampton Wanderers ===
Round 3: Wolverhampton Wanderers 3–1 Bradford Park Avenue

Round 4: Wolverhampton Wanderers 5–1 Leicester City

Round 5: Wolverhampton Wanderers 4–1 Liverpool

Round 6: Wolverhampton Wanderers 2–0 Everton

Semi-Final: Wolverhampton Wanderers 5–0 Grimsby Town

(at Old Trafford)

== See also ==
- FA Cup 1938-39
