= John Anderson (footballer, born 1915) =

Scottish footballer

Personal information
- Full name: John Curr Anderson
- Date of birth: 8 May 1915
- Place of birth: Dundee, Scotland
- Date of death: February 1987 (aged 71)
- Place of death: Portsmouth, England
- Position: Centre forward

Youth career
- Stobswood

Senior career*
Years	Team	Apps	(Gls)
1933–1946	Portsmouth	80	(36)
1946–1947	Aldershot	4	(1)
- * Club domestic league appearances and goals

John Curr Anderson (8 May 1915 – February 1987) was a Scottish professional footballer, who played as a centre forward. The summit of his career was scoring one of the goals for Portsmouth in their 4–1 win over Wolverhampton Wanderers in the 1939 FA Cup Final.

He was the second John Anderson to play for Portsmouth, the first having joined the club in 1903.

== Honours ==
Portsmouth

- FA Cup: 1938–39
