= Cliff Parker (footballer) =

English footballer

Personal information
- Full name: Henry Clifford Parker
- Date of birth: 6 November 1913
- Place of birth: Denaby, England
- Date of death: 1983 (aged 69–70)
- Position: Outside left

Senior career*
Years	Team	Apps	(Gls)
- Denaby United
1931–1933	Doncaster Rovers	52	(11)
1933–1951	Portsmouth	242	(57)
–	Denaby United		
- * Club domestic league appearances and goals

Henry Clifford Parker (6 September 1913 – 1983) was an English footballer born in Denaby, Yorkshire, who played as an outside left for Doncaster Rovers and Portsmouth in the Football League. During the War he worked at the aircraft factory in Hamble-le-Rice and also played football for their works team Folland Aircraft. He scored twice as Portsmouth beat Wolverhampton Wanderers 4–1 in the 1939 FA Cup Final.

== Honours ==
Portsmouth

- FA Cup: 1938–39
