= Arthur Housam =

English footballer

Personal information
- Full name: Arthur Housam
- Date of birth: 17 October 1917
- Place of birth: Sunderland, England
- Date of death: 31 December 1975 (aged 58)
- Place of death: Sunderland, England
- Position: Wing half

Senior career*
Years	Team	Apps	(Gls)
1936–1937	Hylton Colliery		
1937–1948	Sunderland	55	(2)
1948–19??	Horden Colliery Welfare		
- * Club domestic league appearances and goals

Arthur Housam (1 October 1917 – 31 December 1975) was an English professional footballer who played as a wing half for Sunderland.
