= Tommy Roe (footballer) =

English footballer (1900–1972)

Personal information
- Full name: Thomas William Roe
- Date of birth: 8 December 1900
- Place of birth: Evenwood, England
- Date of death: 1972 (aged 71–72)
- Height: 5 ft 8 in (1.73 m)
- Position: Centre forward

Senior career*
Years	Team	Apps	(Gls)
- Esperley Rovers
- Willington Athletic
1922	Durham City	17	(8)
- Northfleet United
1925–1927	Tottenham Hotspur	7	(4)
1927	Nottingham Forest	9	(4)
1928	Luton Town	17	(7)
1929	Walsall	41	(8)
1930	Coventry City	4	(0)
- * Club domestic league appearances and goals

Thomas William Roe (8 December 1900 – 1972) was an English professional footballer who played for Esperley Rovers, Willington Athletic, Durham City, Northfleet United, Tottenham Hotspur, Nottingham Forest, Luton Town, Walsall and Coventry City.

== Football career ==
Roe began his football career with Esperley Rovers and later played for Willington Athletic. In 1922 he joined Durham City where the forward scored eight goals in 17 appearances. Roe joined the Tottenham Hotspur "nursery" club Northfleet United before signing with the Spurs in 1925. He featured in seven matches and found the back of the net four times for the North London club. After leaving White Hart Lane Roe had spells at Nottingham Forest, Luton Town, Walsall and finally Coventry City.
