= Albert Heywood =

English footballer

Personal information
- Full name: Albert Edwards Heywood
- Date of birth: 12 May 1913
- Place of birth: Hartlepool, England
- Date of death: May 1989 (age 75-76)
- Place of death: Hartlepool, England
- Position: Goalkeeper

Youth career
- West Hartlepool Expansion
- Trimdon Grange

Senior career*
Years	Team	Apps	(Gls)
1935–1937	Spennymoor United		
1937–1946	Sunderland	4	(0)
1946–1947	Hartlepools United	39	(0)
1947–19??	Horden Colliery Welfare		
- * Club domestic league appearances and goals

Albert Edwards Heywood (12 May 1913 – May 1989) was an English professional footballer who played as a goalkeeper for Sunderland.
