= Richard Bonney (footballer) =

English football manager and soldier

Richard Bonney was a former Royal Artillery soldier, who in the 1890s was based in Portsmouth and co-founded an amateur army football team named Royal Artillery (Portsmouth) F.C. in 1894. Bonney later became manager of association football club Portsmouth F.C. from August 1904. Previously one of the club's directors, he succeeded former club captain Bob Blyth as manager.

The highlight of Bonney's time at the helm came during the 1906/07 season, which saw the visit of Manchester United F.C. in the English Cup and a new record gate of 24,329 was set at Fratton Park. A 2–2 draw meant a replay at Old Trafford and a 2-1 giant killing by Portsmouth.

The 1910/11 season brought relegation to the second division of the Southern League and the recruitment of Robert Brown from Sheffield Wednesday F.C. as manager.

Bonney's record as manager was 206 played, 99 won, 39 drawn, 68 lost (a win percentage of 48%).
