= Dennis Westcott =

English footballer

Personal information
- Full name: Dennis Westcott
- Date of birth: 2 July 1917
- Place of birth: Wallasey, England
- Date of death: 13 July 1960 (aged 43)
- Place of death: Stafford, England
- Position: Centre forward

Senior career*
Years	Team	Apps	(Gls)
- Wallasey Grocers
–1936	Leasowe Road Brickworks		
1936	New Brighton	18	(10)
1936–1948	Wolverhampton Wanderers	128	(105)
1940–1941	→ Liverpool (guest)	2	(6)
1943–1944	→ Brentford (guest)	5	(6)
1948–1950	Blackburn Rovers	63	(37)
1950–1952	Manchester City	72	(37)
1952–1953	Chesterfield	40	(21)
1953–1957	Stafford Rangers		
Total		328	(185)

International career
1940–1943	England (wartime)	4	(5)
1947	Football League XI	1	(1)
- * Club domestic league appearances and goals

Dennis Westcott (2 July 1917 – 13 July 1960) was an English footballer, who played for New Brighton, Wolverhampton Wanderers, Blackburn Rovers, Manchester City and Chesterfield as a centre forward.

He was posthumously inducted into the Wolverhampton Wanderers Hall of Fame in 2017.

== Career ==
Westcott started his career at local clubs Wallasey Grocers and Leasowe Road Brickworks, before failing trials with Football League clubs Everton and West Ham United. He then joined nearby New Brighton of the Third Division (North) in January 1936 and scored 10 goals in 18 league matches. Wolverhampton Wanderers signed him in July 1936 and gave him a debut against Grimsby in an FA Cup tie. Westcott scored one of the goals as Wolves won 6–2. He scored 22 goals during the 1937–38 season, making him the club's top scorer. The following season, he scored 43 goals in 43 appearances, setting a club record which stood for 50 years until it was broken by Steve Bull. Westcott played in the 1939 FA Cup Final, but Wolves were beaten 4–1 by Portsmouth.

In 1939 competitive football was then suspended due to World War II, depriving Westcott of several years in his prime. During the war he played four wartime internationals for England and scored six goals in five games while guesting with Brentford. When competitive football resumed in 1946, Westcott continued his goalscoring exploits, setting another club record with 38 goals in the 1946–47 season which made him top-scorer in the league. He scored on his only appearance for the Football League XI in March 1947. In 1948 he was released by Wolves and signed for Blackburn Rovers during the month prior to the club's relegation to the Second Division. At Blackburn he scored 37 goals in 63 league appearances. He then signed for Manchester City, where he scored 36 goals in 72 league appearances, finishing as the club's top scorer in each of the two full seasons he played. He then moved to Chesterfield and finished his career with Stafford Rangers.

== Personal life ==
He died from leukaemia in 1960 one week and four days after his 43rd birthday.

== Honours ==
Wolverhampton Wanderers

- Football League War Cup: 1941–42
- FA Cup runner-up: 1938–39

Manchester City

- Football League Second Division runner-up: 1950–51
