= 1938–39 FA Cup =

Tournament details
- Country: England; Wales

Final positions
- Champions: Portsmouth (1st title)
- Runners-up: Wolverhampton Wanderers

The 1938–39 FA Cup was the 64th season of the world's oldest football cup competition, the Football Association Challenge Cup, commonly known as the FA Cup. Portsmouth won the competition for the first time, beating Wolverhampton Wanderers 4–1 in the final at Wembley. As this was the last full FA Cup competition before the Second World War, Portsmouth held the trophy until the end of the 1945–46 season.

Matches were scheduled to be played at the stadium of the team named first on the date specified for each round, which was always a Saturday. Some matches, however, might be rescheduled for other days if there were clashes with games for other competitions or the weather was inclement. If scores were level after 90 minutes had been played, a replay would take place at the stadium of the second-named team later the same week. If the replayed match was drawn further replays would be held until a winner was determined. If scores were level after 90 minutes had been played in a replay, a 30-minute period of extra time would be played.

== Calendar ==
Round	Date
Extra preliminary round	Saturday 3 September 1938
Preliminary round	Saturday 17 September 1938
First round qualifying	Saturday 1 October 1938
Second round qualifying	Saturday 15 October 1938
Third round qualifying	Saturday 29 October 1938
Fourth round qualifying	Saturday 12 November 1938
First round proper	Saturday 26 November 1938
Second round proper	Saturday 10 December 1938
Third round proper	Saturday 7 January 1939
Fourth round proper	Saturday 21 January 1939
Fifth round proper	Saturday 11 February 1939
Sixth round proper	Saturday 4 March 1939
Semi-Finals	Saturday 25 March 1939
Final	Saturday 29 April 1939

== Qualifying rounds ==
Most participating clubs that were not members of the Football League competed in the qualifying rounds to secure one of 25 places available in the first round.

The 25 winners from the fourth qualifying round were North Shields, Horden Colliery Welfare, Lancaster City, Stalybridge Celtic, Chorley, Workington, Runcorn, Scunthorpe & Lindsey United, Gainsborough Trinity, Wellington Town, Kidderminster Harriers, Peterborough United, Colchester United, Lowestoft Town, Chelmsford City, Apsley (later to be known as Hemel Hempstead Town), Hayes, Corinthian, Folkestone, Guildford City, Walthamstow Avenue, Tunbridge Wells Rangers, Street, Cheltenham Town and Yeovil & Petter's United.

Advancing to the competition proper for the first time were Runcorn, Colchester United, Apsley and Street, while Lowestoft Town was doing so for the first time since 1926–27, Horden Colliery Welfare for the first time since 1925-26, and Chorley for the first time since 1899-1900.

Hayes was the only club to progress from the extra preliminary round to the first round proper, defeating Wycombe Wanderers, Yiewsley, Chesham United, Banbury Spencer, Southall and Newport (IOW) to secure their place in the main draw. However, Chelmsford City was the most successful non-league club this season, moving from the preliminary round to the fourth round proper and defeating Barking, Ford Sports (Dagenham), Crittall Athletic, Romford, Dulwich Hamlet, Kidderminster Harriers and Football League sides Darlington and Southampton in their history-making run.

== First round proper ==
At this stage, 41 clubs from the Football League Third Division North and South joined the 25 non-league clubs that came through the qualifying rounds. Barnsley, York City and Notts County were given byes to the third round. To make the number of matches up, non-league Scarborough and Bromley were given byes to this round, with Bromley having won the previous season's FA Amateur Cup.

34 matches were scheduled to be played on Saturday, 26 November 1938. Eight were drawn and went to replays in the following midweek fixture.

Tie no	Home team	Score	Away team	Date
1	Chester	3–1	Bradford City	26 November 1938
2	Darlington	4–0	Stalybridge Celtic	26 November 1938
3	Bournemouth & Boscombe Athletic	2–1	Bristol City	26 November 1938
4	Watford	4–1	Northampton Town	26 November 1938
5	Reading	3–3	Newport County	26 November 1938
Replay	Newport County	3–1	Reading	5 December 1938
6	Walsall	4–1	Carlisle United	26 November 1938
7	Folkestone	2–1	Colchester United	26 November 1938
8	Lincoln City	4–1	Barrow	26 November 1938
9	Gainsborough Trinity	2–1	Gateshead	26 November 1938
10	Swindon Town	6–0	Lowestoft Town	26 November 1938
11	Scarborough	0–0	Southport	26 November 1938
Replay	Southport	5–3	Scarborough	29 November 1938
12	Doncaster Rovers	4–2	New Brighton	26 November 1938
13	Wrexham	1–2	Port Vale	26 November 1938
14	Ipswich Town	7–0	Street	26 November 1938
15	Bristol Rovers	4–1	Peterborough United	26 November 1938
16	Bromley	2–1	Apsley	26 November 1938
17	Hull City	4–1	Rotherham United	26 November 1938
18	Clapton Orient	3–1	Hayes	26 November 1938
19	Oldham Athletic	2–2	Crewe Alexandra	26 November 1938
Replay	Crewe Alexandra	1–0	Oldham Athletic	30 November 1938
20	Crystal Palace	1–1	Queens Park Rangers	26 November 1938
Replay	Queens Park Rangers	3–0	Crystal Palace	28 November 1938
21	Southend United	3–0	Corinthian	26 November 1938
22	Hartlepools United	2–1	Accrington Stanley	26 November 1938
23	Scunthorpe & Lindsey United	4–2	Lancaster City	26 November 1938
24	Halifax Town	7–3	Rochdale	26 November 1938
25	Cheltenham Town	1–1	Cardiff City	26 November 1938
Replay	Cardiff City	1–0	Cheltenham Town	30 November 1938
26	Yeovil & Petter's United	2–1	Brighton & Hove Albion	26 November 1938
27	Runcorn	3–0	Wellington Town	26 November 1938
28	Torquay United	3–1	Exeter City	26 November 1938
29	Workington	1–1	Mansfield Town	26 November 1938
Replay	Mansfield Town	2–1	Workington	30 November 1938
30	Walthamstow Avenue	4–1	Tunbridge Wells Rangers	26 November 1938
31	Aldershot	1–1	Guildford City	26 November 1938
Replay	Guildford City	3–4	Aldershot	30 November 1938
32	Horden CW	1–1	Chorley	26 November 1938
Replay	Chorley	1–2	Horden CW	30 November 1938
33	North Shields	1–4	Stockport County	26 November 1938
34	Chelmsford City	4–0	Kidderminster Harriers	26 November 1938

== Second round proper ==
The matches were played on Saturday, 10 December 1938. Four matches were drawn, with replays taking place in the following midweek fixture. One of these, Halifax Town vs. Mansfield Town, then went to two more replays before being settled.

Tie no	Home team	Score	Away team	Date
1	Chester	2–2	Hull City	10 December 1938
Replay	Hull City	0–1	Chester	15 December 1938
2	Walsall	4–2	Clapton Orient	10 December 1938
3	Folkestone	1–1	Yeovil & Petter's United	10 December 1938
Replay	Yeovil & Petter's United	1–0	Folkestone	15 December 1938
4	Lincoln City	8–1	Bromley	10 December 1938
5	Gainsborough Trinity	0–1	Doncaster Rovers	10 December 1938
6	Ipswich Town	4–1	Torquay United	10 December 1938
7	Stockport County	0–0	Walthamstow Avenue	10 December 1938
Replay	Walthamstow Avenue	1–3	Stockport County	15 December 1938
8	Bristol Rovers	0–3	Bournemouth & Boscombe Athletic	10 December 1938
9	Hartlepools United	0–2	Queens Park Rangers	10 December 1938
10	Scunthorpe & Lindsey United	1–2	Watford	10 December 1938
11	Cardiff City	1–0	Crewe Alexandra	10 December 1938
12	Port Vale	0–1	Southend United	10 December 1938
13	Halifax Town	1–1	Mansfield Town	10 December 1938
Replay	Mansfield Town	3–3	Halifax Town	14 December 1938
Replay	Mansfield Town	0–0	Halifax Town	19 December 1938
Replay	Mansfield Town	1–2	Halifax Town	21 December 1938
14	Southport	2–0	Swindon Town	10 December 1938
15	Runcorn	3–1	Aldershot	10 December 1938
16	Horden CW	2–3	Newport County	10 December 1938
17	Chelmsford City	3–1	Darlington	10 December 1938

== Third round proper ==
The 44 First and Second Division clubs entered the competition at this stage along with Barnsley, York City and Notts County.

The matches were scheduled for Saturday, 7 January 1939, although seven matches began at later dates. Eight matches were drawn and went to replays, with one of these requiring a second replay to settle the fixture.

Tie no	Home team	Score	Away team	Date
1	Birmingham	2–0	Halifax Town	7 January 1939
2	Blackpool	1–2	Sheffield United	7 January 1939
3	Chester	1–0	Coventry City	7 January 1939
4	Chesterfield	1–1	Southend United	11 January 1939
Replay	Southend United	4–3	Chesterfield	16 January 1939
5	Liverpool	3–0	Luton Town	7 January 1939
6	Leicester City	1–1	Stoke City	7 January 1939
Replay	Stoke City	1–2	Leicester City	11 January 1939
7	Notts County	3–1	Burnley	7 January 1939
8	Blackburn Rovers	2–0	Swansea Town	7 January 1939
9	Aston Villa	1–1	Ipswich Town	7 January 1939
Replay	Ipswich Town	1–2	Aston Villa	11 January 1939
10	Sheffield Wednesday	1–1	Yeovil & Petter's United	7 January 1939
Replay	Yeovil & Petter's United	1–2	Sheffield Wednesday	12 January 1939
11	Grimsby Town	6–0	Tranmere Rovers	10 January 1939
12	Wolverhampton Wanderers	3–1	Bradford Park Avenue	7 January 1939
13	Middlesbrough	0–0	Bolton Wanderers	7 January 1939
Replay	Bolton Wanderers	0–0	Middlesbrough	11 January 1939
Replay	Bolton Wanderers	0–1	Middlesbrough	16 January 1939
14	West Bromwich Albion	0–0	Manchester United	7 January 1939
Replay	Manchester United	1–5	West Bromwich Albion	11 January 1939
15	Sunderland	3–0	Plymouth Argyle	7 January 1939
16	Derby County	0–1	Everton	7 January 1939
17	Tottenham Hotspur	7–1	Watford	7 January 1939
18	Queens Park Rangers	1–2	West Ham United	7 January 1939
19	Fulham	6–0	Bury	7 January 1939
20	Barnsley	1–2	Stockport County	7 January 1939
21	Brentford	0–2	Newcastle United	7 January 1939
22	Portsmouth	4–0	Lincoln City	7 January 1939
23	Norwich City	0–5	Manchester City	12 January 1939
24	Chelsea	2–1	Arsenal	7 January 1939
25	Huddersfield Town	0–0	Nottingham Forest	11 January 1939
Replay	Nottingham Forest	0–3	Huddersfield Town	16 January 1939
26	Cardiff City	1–0	Charlton Athletic	7 January 1939
27	Newport County	0–2	Walsall	7 January 1939
28	Southport	1–1	Doncaster Rovers	10 January 1939
Replay	Doncaster Rovers	2–1	Southport	12 January 1939
29	Runcorn	2–4	Preston North End	7 January 1939
30	Leeds United	3–1	Bournemouth & Boscombe Athletic	11 January 1939
31	York City	0–5	Millwall	11 January 1939
32	Chelmsford City	4–1	Southampton	7 January 1939

== Fourth round proper ==
The matches were scheduled for Saturday, 21 January 1939. Five games were drawn and went to replays, of which two went to a second replay. Chelmsford City was the last non-league club remaining in the competition, participating in their ninth round of this tournament.

Tie no	Home team	Score	Away team	Date
1	Birmingham	6–0	Chelmsford City	21 January 1939
2	Liverpool	5–1	Stockport County	21 January 1939
3	Preston North End	2–0	Aston Villa	21 January 1939
4	Notts County	0–0	Walsall	21 January 1939
Replay	Walsall	4–0	Notts County	26 January 1939
5	Blackburn Rovers	4–2	Southend United	21 January 1939
6	Sheffield Wednesday	1–1	Chester	21 January 1939
Replay	Chester	1–1	Sheffield Wednesday	25 January 1939
Replay	Sheffield Wednesday	2–0	Chester	30 January 1939
7	Wolverhampton Wanderers	5–1	Leicester City	21 January 1939
8	Middlesbrough	0–2	Sunderland	21 January 1939
9	Everton	8–0	Doncaster Rovers	21 January 1939
10	Sheffield United	2–0	Manchester City	21 January 1939
11	Portsmouth	2–0	West Bromwich Albion	21 January 1939
12	West Ham United	3–3	Tottenham Hotspur	21 January 1939
Replay	Tottenham Hotspur	1–1	West Ham United	30 January 1939
Replay	West Ham United	2–1	Tottenham Hotspur	2 February 1939
13	Millwall	2–2	Grimsby Town	21 January 1939
Replay	Grimsby Town	3–2	Millwall	24 January 1939
14	Chelsea	3–0	Fulham	21 January 1939
15	Cardiff City	0–0	Newcastle United	21 January 1939
Replay	Newcastle United	4–1	Cardiff City	25 January 1939
16	Leeds United	2–4	Huddersfield Town	21 January 1939

== Fifth round proper ==
The matches were scheduled for Saturday, 11 February 1939. There were four replays, of which two went to second replays.

Tie no	Home team	Score	Away team	Date
1	Birmingham	2–2	Everton	11 February 1939
Replay	Everton	2–1	Birmingham	15 February 1939
2	Wolverhampton Wanderers	4–1	Liverpool	11 February 1939
3	Sunderland	1–1	Blackburn Rovers	11 February 1939
Replay	Blackburn Rovers	0–0	Sunderland	16 February 1939
Replay	Blackburn Rovers	1–0	Sunderland	20 February 1939
4	Sheffield United	0–0	Grimsby Town	11 February 1939
Replay	Grimsby Town	1–0	Sheffield United	14 February 1939
5	Newcastle United	1–2	Preston North End	11 February 1939
6	Portsmouth	2–0	West Ham United	11 February 1939
7	Chelsea	1–1	Sheffield Wednesday	11 February 1939
Replay	Sheffield Wednesday	0–0	Chelsea	13 February 1939
Replay	Chelsea	3–1	Sheffield Wednesday	20 February 1939
8	Huddersfield Town	3–0	Walsall	11 February 1939

== Sixth round proper ==
The four sixth round ties were scheduled to be played on Saturday, 4 March 1939. There was one replay, in the Huddersfield Town–Blackburn Rovers match.

Tie no	Home team	Score	Away team	Date
1	Wolverhampton Wanderers	2–0	Everton	4 March 1939
2	Portsmouth	1–0	Preston North End	4 March 1939
3	Chelsea	0–1	Grimsby Town	4 March 1939
4	Huddersfield Town	1–1	Blackburn Rovers	4 March 1939
Replay	Blackburn Rovers	1–2	Huddersfield Town	9 March 1939

== Semi-finals ==
The semi-final matches were played on Saturday, 25 March 1939. Wolverhampton Wanderers and Portsmouth won their matches to meet in the final at Wembley.

25 March 1939
15:00

Wolverhampton Wanderers	5–0	Grimsby Town

Old Trafford, Manchester

25 March 1939
15:00

Portsmouth	2–1	Huddersfield Town

Highbury, London

== Final ==
The 1939 FA Cup Final was contested by Portsmouth and Wolverhampton Wanderers at Wembley. Portsmouth won 4–1, with goals from Bert Barlow, John Anderson and two by Cliff Parker. Dicky Dorsett scored Wolves' effort.

As a result of the suspension of the FA Cup for the duration of the Second World War, the next FA Cup final was not until seven years later in 1946, thereby enabling Portsmouth fans to claim that their team has held the Cup for the longest time.

=== Match details ===
29 April 1939
15:00 GMT

Portsmouth	4–1	Wolverhampton Wanderers
Barlow 29'; Anderson 43'; Parker 46', 71'		Dorsett 54'

Empire Stadium, Wembley, London
Attendance: 99,370
Referee: T. Thompson (Lemington, Newcastle upon Tyne)

Portsmouth	Wolves

== See also ==
- FA Cup final
