= 1949–50 Portsmouth F.C. season =

Portsmouth F.C.
1949–50 season
- Manager: Bob Jackson
- Division One: 1st
- FA Cup: 5th Round
- FA Charity Shield: Shared
- Top goalscorer: League: All: Ike Clarke; 20 goals
- Highest home attendance: 50,248
- Lowest home attendance: 26,728
Home colours

Portsmouth Football Club were league champions of 1949–50. They have not been champions of England since 1950. The club retained the title they won in 1948–49, beating Aston Villa 5–1 on the last day of the season, and are thus one of only five English teams to have won back-to-back titles since the end of World War II.

== First Division ==
Opposing Team	Result F–A	Date	Venue
Newcastle United	3–1	20 August 1949	A
Manchester City	1–1	24 August 1949	H
Blackpool	2–3	27 August 1949	H
Manchester City	0–1	31 August 1949	A
Middlesbrough	5–1	3 September 1949	A
Aston Villa	0–1	5 September 1949	A
Everton	7–0	10 September 1949	H
Huddersfield Town	1–0	17 September 1949	A
Bolton Wanderers	1–1	24 September 1949	H
Wolverhampton Wanderers	1–1	1 October 1949	H
Birmingham City	3–0	8 October 1949	A
Derby County	3–1	15 October 1949	H
West Bromwich Albion	0–3	22 October 1949	A
Manchester United	0–0	29 October 1949	H
Chelsea	4–1	5 November 1949	A
Stoke City	0–0	12 November 1949	H
Burnley	1–2	19 November 1949	A
Sunderland	2–2	26 November 1949	H
Liverpool	2–2	3 December 1949	A
Arsenal	2–1	10 December 1949	H
Newcastle United	1–0	17 December 1949	H
Blackpool	1–2	24 December 1949	A
Charlton Athletic	2–1	26 December 1949	A
Charlton Athletic	1–0	27 December 1949	H
Middlesbrough	1–1	31 December 1949	H
Everton	2–1	14 January 1950	A
Huddersfield Town	4–0	21 January 1950	H
Bolton Wanderers	0–1	4 February 1950	A
Wolverhampton Wanderers	0–1	18 February 1950	A
Birmingham City	2–0	25 February 1950	H
Derby County	1–2	8 March 1950	A
Burnley	2–1	11 March 1950	H
Sunderland	1–1	18 March 1950	A
Chelsea	4–0	25 March 1950	H
Stoke City	1–0	1 April 1950	A
Fulham	3–0	7 April 1950	H
West Bromwich Albion	0–1	8 April 1950	H
Fulham	1–0	10 April 1950	A
Manchester United	2–0	15 April 1950	A
Liverpool	2–1	22 April 1950	H
Arsenal	0–2	3 May 1950	A
Aston Villa	5–1	6 May 1950	H

Pos	Team	Pld	W	D	L	GF	GA	GAv	Pts
1	Portsmouth (C)	42	22	9	11	74	38	1.947	53
2	Wolverhampton Wanderers	42	20	13	9	76	49	1.551	53
3	Sunderland	42	21	10	11	83	62	1.339	52
4	Manchester United	42	18	14	10	69	44	1.568	50
5	Newcastle United	42	19	12	11	77	55	1.400	50

Source: World Football
Rules for classification: 1) Points; 2) Goal average; 3) Goals scored
(C) Champions

== FA Cup ==
Opposing Team	Result F–A	Date	Venue	Round
Norwich City	1–1	7 January 1950	H	3rd Round
Norwich City	2–0	12 January 1950	A	3rd Round Replay
Grimsby Town	5–0	28 January 1950	H	4th Round
Manchester United	3–3	11 February 1950	A	5th Round
Manchester United	1–3	15 February 1950	H	5th Round Replay

== 1949 FA Charity Shield ==
Opposing Team	Result F–A	Date	Venue
Wolverhampton Wanderers	1–1	19 October 1949	Highbury, London

== Players Used ==
Player	Position	League	Goals	Cup	Goals	Charity Shield	Goals	Games	Goals
(England) Bert Barlow (1939 FA Cup Winner)	Inside forward	2	1	–	–	1	–	3	1
(England) Ron Bennett	Winger	2	1	–	–	–	–	2	1
(England) Ernest Butler	Goalkeeper	42	–	5	–	1	–	48	–
(England) Ike Clarke	Inside forward	37	17	5	3	1	–	43	20
(Scotland) Jimmy Dawson	Winger	1	–	–	–	–	–	1	–
(Jamaica) Lindy Delapenha	Right wing	5	–	1	1	–	–	6	1
(England) Jimmy Dickinson	Wing half	41	–	5	–	1	–	46	–
(Sweden) Dan Ekner	Centre forward	5	–	–	–	–	–	5	–
(Scotland) Jimmy Elder	Wing half	1	–	–	–	–	–	1	–
(England) Harry Ferrier	Full back	42	1	5	1	1	–	48	2
(England) Reg Flewin (captain)	Centre half	24	–	5	–	–	–	29	–
(England) Jack Froggatt	Left wing	39	15	4	2	1	–	46	16
(England) Peter Harris	Right wing	40	16	4	1	–	–	44	17
(England) Billy Hindmarsh	Full back	34	–	5	–	1	–	40	–
(England) Peter Higham	Centre forward	1	–	–	–	–	–	1	–
(England) Cliff Parker (1939 FA Cup Winner)	Winger	3	–	3	1	–	–	6	1
(India) Reg Pickett	Centre forward	14	1	1	–	–	–	15	1
(England) Len Phillips	Inside forward	34	5	5	1	–	–	39	6
(Scotland) Duggie Reid	Inside forward	27	16	2	2	1	1	30	19
(England) Phil Rookes	Full back	3	–	–	–	–	–	3	–
(Scotland) Jimmy Scoular	Wing half	36	–	5	–	1	–	42	–
(England) Bill Spence	Centre half	16	–	–	–	–	–	16	–
(Scotland) Jimmy Stephen	Full back	1	0	–	–	–	–	1	–
(Scotland) Bill Thompson	Wing half	9	2	–	–	1	–	10	2
(England) Jasper Yeuell	Full back	4	–	–	–	–	–	4	–
