= List of Portsmouth F.C. players =

This is a list of notable footballers who have played for Portsmouth. The aim is for this list to include all players that have played 100 or more senior matches for the club. Other players who are deemed to have played an important role for the club can be included, but the reason for their notability should be included in the 'Notes' column.

For a list of all Portsmouth players with a Wikipedia article, see Category:Portsmouth F.C. players, and for the current squad see the main Portsmouth F.C. article.

== Table ==
Players should be listed in chronological order according to the year in which they first played for the club, and then by alphabetical order of their surname. Appearances and goals should be for first-team competitive games and include substitute appearances, but exclude wartime matches.

Statistics are up to date as of 27 April 2024.

| Name | International Team | Position | Club career | Seasons at Portsmouth | League apps | League goals | Total apps | Total goals | Notes |
|---|---|---|---|---|---|---|---|---|---|
| Matt Reilly | Ireland | GK | 1899–1904 | 5 | ? | 0 | 138 | 0 | First ever Portsmouth F.C. player, signed from Royal Artillery (Portsmouth) F.C. |
| Tom Wilkie | | DF | 1899–1904 | 5 | 105 | 0 | 105 | 0 | b.1876, Edinburgh, Scotland. d.8 January 1932, Perth, Australia. |
| Bob Blyth | | MF | 1899–1901 | 2* | ? | ? | ? | ? | *Played as player-manager after Frank Brettell, becoming second manager 1901–1904. |
| Sandy Brown | Scotland | FW | 1899–1900, 1901–1903 | 3 | ? | 0 | 182 | 58 | b.7 April 1879. d.6 March 1944. 1 Scotland cap |
| Dan Cunliffe | England | FW | 1899–1900, 1901–1906 | 6 | 284 | 157 | 284 | 157 | b.11 June 1875. d.28 December 1937. Scored the first ever goal at Fratton Park. 1 England cap |
| Thomas Cleghorn | | DF | 1899–1903 | 4 | 58 | 0 | 58 | 0 | b.13 February 1870, Edinburgh, Scotland. d.23 October 1946 |
| Bobby Marshall | | MF | 1899–1904 | 5 | 131 | 19 | 131 | 19 | b.1876, Edinburgh, Scotland. d.1931 |
| Willie Haines | | FW | 1922–1928 | 6 | 164 | 119 | 179 | 129 | |
| Ernie Butler | | GK | 1946-1953 | 7 | 222 | 0 | 246 | 0 | |
| Dan McPhail | | GK | 1922–1931 | 9 | 128 | 0 | 131+ | 0 | |
| George Clifford | | DF | 1924–1930 | 6 | 169 | 0 | 176 | 0 | |
| Reginald Davies | | DF | 1924–1928 | 4 | 146 | 3 | 157 | 3 | |
| Harry Foxall | | | 1924–1928 | 4 | 139 | 8 | 150 | 8 | Stats do not include possible games played before 1924 |
| John McColgan | | | 1924–1930 | 6 | 171 | 0 | 187 | 1 | Stats do not include possible games played before 1924 |
| Dave Watson | | | 1924–1930 | 6 | 175 | 37 | 188 | 39 | Stats do not include possible games played before 1924 |
| Frederick Cook | | | 1925–1933 | 8 | 241 | 39 | 262 | 40 | |
| William Moffatt | | | 1925–1929 | 4 | 126 | 2 | 134 | 2 | |
| Fred Forward | | | 1926–1932 | 6 | 179 | 28 | 192 | 30 | |
| Jimmy Nichol | | | 1927–1937 | 10 | 351 | 10 | 381 | 10 | |
| Septimus Rutherford | | | 1927–1936 | 9 | 119 | 33 | 129 | 37 | |
| Jack Smith | | | 1927–1935 | 8 | 260 | 62 | 288 | 70 | |
| Jack Weddle | | FW | 1927–1938 | 11 | 367 | 170 | 395 | 183 | |
| Jock Gilfillan | | GK | 1928–1937 | 9 | 331 | 0 | 359 | 0 | |
| Jimmy Easson | Scotland | FW | 1928–1939 | 11 | 292 | 102 | 312 | 107 | |
| Reg Flewin | | DF | 1937–1953 | 16 | 150 | 0 | ? | 0 | |
| Jimmy Dickinson | England | WH | 1946–1965 | 19 | 764 | 9 | 845 | ? | Record Portsmouth appearances |
| Harry Ferrier | | DF | 1946–1954 | 9 | 241 | 8 | ? | ? | |
| Jack Froggatt | England | DF | 1946–1954 | 9 | 280 | 67 | ? | ? | |
| Peter Harris | England | FW | 1946?–1960 | 14 | 479 | 193 | ? | ? | Record Portsmouth goalscorer |
| Len Phillips | England | FW | 1946–1956 | 9 | 245 | 48 | ? | ? | |
| Duggie Reid | | FW | 1946–1956 | 10 | 308 | 129 | 338 | 139 | |
| Phil Gunter | | DF | 1951–1964 | 13 | 321 | 2 | ? | ? | |
| Ron Saunders | | FW | 1958–1964 | 6 | 236 | 145 | ? | ? | |
| Dick Beattie | | GK | 1959–1962 | 3 | 122 | 0 | ? | ? | |
| Mick Mellows | | MF | 1973–1978 | 5 | 181 | 16 | ? | ? | |
| Alan Knight | | GK | 1978–2000 | 22 | 683 | 0 | 801 | 0 | |
| Steve Aizlewood | | DF | 1979–1984 | 5 | 175 | 13 | 204 | 15 | |
| Mick Tait | | MF | 1980–1987 | 7 | 240 | 30 | 280 | 32 | |
| Kevin Ball | | MF | 1982–1990 | 8 | 105 | 4 | 128 | 4 | |
| Paul Hardyman | | DF | 1983–1989 | 6 | 117 | 3 | ? | ? | |
| Noel Blake | | DF | 1984–1988 | 4 | 144 | 10 | 168 | 13 | |
| Micky Quinn | | FW | 1985–1988 | 3 | 121 | 54 | ? | ? | |
| Warren Aspinall | | MF | 1988–1993 | 5 | 132 | 21 | 159 | 28 | |
| Andy Awford | | DF | 1989–2000 | 11 | 313 | 3 | 372 | 3 | |
| John Beresford | | DF | 1989–1992 | 3 | 107 | 8 | 132 | 10 | |
| Darryl Powell | | MF | 1989–1995 | 6 | 132 | 16 | 156 | 19 | |
| Guy Whittingham | | FW | 1989–1993, 1999–2001 | 7 | 195 | 99 | 226 | 115 | |
| Guy Butters | | DF | 1990–1997 | 7 | 154 | 6 | 186 | 7 | |
| Paul Walsh | | FW | 1992–1994, 1995–1996 | 5 | 94 | 19 | 113 | 26 | |
| Alan McLoughlin | | MF | 1992–1999 | 8 | 309 | 54 | 361 | 69 | |
| Aaron Flahavan | | GK | 1994–2001 | 7 | 93 | 0 | 105 | 0 | |
| Fitzroy Simpson | Jamaica | MF | 1995–1999 | 5 | 148 | 10 | 169 | 10 | |
| Steve Claridge | | FW | 1998, 1998–2001 | 4 | 114 | 36 | 124 | 37 | |
| Thomas Thogersen | | MF | 1998–2002 | 5 | 108 | 8 | 119 | 0 | |
| Gary O'Neil | | MF | 1999–2007 | 9 | 174 | 16 | 193 | 17 | |
| Kevin Harper | | MF | 2000–2005 | 6 | 119 | 9 | 128 | 9 | |
| Linvoy Primus | | DF | 2000–2009 | 10 | 198 | 5 | 219 | 5 | |
| Nigel Quashie | Scotland | MF | 2000–2005 | 6 | 148 | 13 | 163 | 14 | |
| Robert Prosinecki | Yugoslavia; Croatia | MF | 2001–2002 | 2 | 33 | 9 | 33 | 9 | Only non-British player to be voted into all-time best Portsmouth eleven |
| Paul Merson | England | MF | 2002–2003 | 2 | 44 | 12 | 44 | 12 | Captain of promotion winning side 2002-2003 |
| Richard Hughes | Scotland | MF | 2002–2011 | 10 | 130 | 0 | 164 | 2 | |
| Shaka Hislop | Trinidad and Tobago | GK | 2002–2005 | 4 | 93 | 0 | 100 | 0 | |
| Svetoslav Todorov | Bulgaria | FW | 2002–2007 | 6 | 77 | 33 | 83 | 33 | Top scorer 2002–03 First Division |
| Arjan De Zeeuw | | DF | 2002–2005 | 4 | 106 | 5 | 118 | 5 | |
| Matthew Taylor | | MF | 2002–2008 | 7 | 178 | 23 | 203 | 29 | |
| Dejan Stefanovic | Serbia and Montenegro | DF | 2003–2007 | 5 | 112 | 3 | 124 | 3 | |
| Jamie Ashdown | | GK | 2004-2012 | 9 | 109 | 0 | 124 | 0 | |
| Sean Davis | | MF | 2006–2009 | 4 | 102 | 2 | 117 | 3 | |
| Sol Campbell | England | DF | 2006–2009 | 4 | 95 | 2 | 111 | 2 | |
| David James | England | GK | 2006–2010 | 5 | 134 | 0 | 158 | 0 | |
| Glen Johnson | England | DF | 2006–2009 | 4 | 84 | 4 | 100 | 4 | |
| Nwankwo Kanu | Nigeria | FW | 2006-2012 | 7 | 143 | 20 | 167 | 28 | |
| Niko Kranjcar | Croatia | MF | 2006–2009 | 4 | 83 | 9 | 100 | 12 | |
| Hermann Hreidarsson | Iceland | DF | 2007-2012 | 6 | 102 | 7 | 123 | 8 | - |
| John Utaka | Nigeria | FW | 2007–2011 | 5 | 90 | 10 | 114 | 13 | |
| Hayden Mullins | | MF | 2009-2012 | 4 | 114 | 3 | 129 | 3 | |
| Jed Wallace | | MF | 2011-2015 | 5 | 107 | 26 | 118 | 29 | |
| Johannes Ertl | | MF | 2011-2015 | 5 | 80 | 2 | 88 | 2 | 2012-13 Player of the Season |
| Jack Whatmough | | DF | 2012-2021 | 9 | 121 | 3 | 136 | 3 | |
| Ben Close | | MF | 2014-2021 | 7 | 138 | 14 | 190 | 18 | |
| Conor Chaplin | | FW | 2014-2018 | 5 | 104 | 22 | 122 | 25 | |
| Kyle Bennett | | MF | 2015-2018 | 3 | 99 | 12 | 117 | 13 | |
| Gareth Evans | | MF | 2015-2020 | 6 | 173 | 32 | 218 | 38 | |
| Christian Burgess | | DF | 2015-2020 | 5 | 173 | 10 | 210 | 12 | 2019-20 Player of the Season |
| Matthew Clarke | | DF | 2015-2019 | 4 | 150 | 7 | 175 | 9 | 2017-18 and 2018-19 Player of the Season |
| Jamal Lowe | | MF | 2017–2019 | 3 | 103 | 25 | 119 | 29 | |
| Tom Naylor | | MF | 2018–2021 | 3 | 122 | 11 | 149 | 13 | |
| Ronan Curtis | Republic of Ireland | FW | 2018–2023 | 5 | 184 | 42 | 226 | 57 | |
| Craig MacGillivray | | GK | 2018–2021 | 3 | 112 | 0 | 135 | 0 | 2020-21 Player of the Season |
| Lee Brown | | DF | 2018–2022 | 4 | 111 | 6 | 131 | 6 | |
| Sean Raggett | | DF | 2019–2024 | 5 | 186 | 13 | 227 | 17 | 2021-22 Player of the Season |
| Joe Morrell | Wales | MF | 2021–present | 3 | 92 | 1 | 105 | 1 | |
| Connor Ogilvie | | DF | 2021–present | 3 | 101 | 8 | 117 | 8 | |
| Colby Bishop | | FW | 2022-present | 2 | 78 | 36 | 96 | 44 | 2022-23 Player of the Season |
| Marlon Pack | | MF | 2022–present | 2 | 70 | 8 | 76 | 8 | 2023-24 Player of the Season |
