= 1948–49 Portsmouth F.C. season =

Portsmouth F.C.
1948–49 season
- Manager: Bob Jackson
- First Division: 1st
- FA Cup: Semi-finals
- Top goalscorer: League: Peter Harris (18); All: Peter Harris (22)
Home colours

In Portsmouth Football Club's Golden Jubilee season of 1948–49, the club were tipped to be the first team of the 20th century to win the Football League and FA Cup double. However, Pompey crashed out of the FA Cup in the semi-final against Leicester City, but made up for it by claiming the league title in spectacular fashion. That season also saw a record attendance of 51,385, a record which still stands to this day.

== First Division ==
Date	Opponents	Venue	Result	Scorers	Attendance	Report
21-Aug-48	Preston North End	A	2–2	Reid Barlow	32,000	Report
25-Aug-48	Everton	H	4–0	Barlow 2 Froggatt 2	31,000	Report
28-Aug-48	Burnley	H	1–0	Froggatt	38,000	Report
01-Sep-48	Everton	A	4–0	Harris Barlow Reid Froggatt 2	40,911	Report
04-Sep-48	Stoke City	A	1–0	Harris	30,000	Report
08-Sep-48	Middlesbrough	H	1–0	Reid	33,000	Report
11-Sep-48	Charlton Athletic	H	3–0	Reid 3	39,000	Report
15-Sep-48	Middlesbrough	A	1–1	Barlow	35,000	Report
18-Sep-48	Manchester City	A	1–1	Reid	46,372	Report
25-Sep-48	Sheffield United	H	3–0	Harris Phillips 2	36,000	Report
02-Oct-48	Newcastle United	H	1–0	Phillips	44,000	Report
09-Oct-48	Aston Villa	A	1–1	Reid	55,000	Report
16-Oct-48	Sunderland	H	3–0	Harris Reid Froggatt	35,000	Report
23-Oct-48	Wolverhampton Wanderers	A	0–3		50,000	Report
30-Oct-48	Bolton Wanderers	H	0–0		35,000	Report
06-Nov-48	Liverpool	A	1–3	Froggatt	43,665	Report
13-Nov-48	Blackpool	H	1–1	Harris	44,000	Report
20-Nov-48	Derby County	A	0–1		34,000	Report
27-Nov-48	Arsenal	H	4–1	Barlow Clarke Phillips Froggatt	42,500	Report
04-Dec-48	Huddersfield Town	A	0–0		21,785	Report
11-Dec-48	Manchester United	H	2–2	Clarke Froggatt	30,000	Report
18-Dec-48	Preston North End	H	3–1	Harris Barlow Phillips	26,000	Report
25-Dec-48	Chelsea	A	2–1	Harris 2	42,153	Report
27-Dec-48	Chelsea	H	5–2	Harris 2 Barlow Clarke Own goal	43,000	Report
01-Jan-49	Burnley	A	1–2	Own goal	31,305	Report
15-Jan-49	Stoke City	H	1–0	Froggatt	34,000	Report
22-Jan-49	Charlton Athletic	A	1–0	Clarke	61,475	Report
05-Feb-49	Manchester City	H	3–1	Harris Clarke 2	34,500	Report
19-Feb-49	Sheffield United	A	1–3	Froggatt	46,000	Report
05-Mar-49	Aston Villa	H	3–0	Phillips 2 Froggatt	34,000	Report
12-Mar-49	Sunderland	A	4–1	Reid 2 Froggatt Phillips	57,229	Report
19-Mar-49	Derby County	H	1–0	Phillips	43,000	Report
02-Apr-49	Liverpool	H	3–2	Harris Clarke Phillips	34,500	Report
06-Apr-49	Newcastle United	A	5–0	Harris 2 Froggatt 3	60,611	Report
09-Apr-49	Blackpool	A	0–1		29,000	Report
15-Apr-49	Birmingham City	H	3–1	Reid 2 Clarke	38,000	Report
16-Apr-49	Wolverhampton Wanderers	H	5–0	Reid 2 Clarke 2 Phillips	44,000	Report
18-Apr-49	Birmingham City	A	0–3		30,000	Report
23-Apr-49	Bolton Wanderers	A	2–1	Harris Clarke	28,816	Report
30-Apr-49	Huddersfield Town	H	2–0	Reid Clarke	36,500	Report
04-May-49	Arsenal	A	2–3	Clarke 2	60,000	Report
07-May-49	Manchester United	A	2–3	Harris Reid	39,608	Report

== League table ==
Pos	Team	Pld	W	D	L	GF	GA	GAv	Pts
1	Portsmouth (C)	42	25	8	9	84	42	2.000	58
2	Manchester United	42	21	11	10	77	44	1.750	53
3	Derby County	42	22	9	11	74	55	1.345	53
4	Newcastle United	42	20	12	10	70	56	1.250	52
5	Arsenal	42	18	13	11	74	44	1.682	49

Source: World Football
Rules for classification: 1) Points; 2) Goal average; 3) Goals scored
(C) Champions

== FA Cup ==
Date	Opponents	Venue	Result	Scorers	Attendance	Report
08-Jan-49	Stockport County	H	7–0	Harris 3 Clarke 2 Phillips 2	33,590	Report
29-Jan-49	Sheffield Wednesday	H	2–1	Harris Phillips	47,188	Report
12-Feb-49	Newport County	H	3–2	Phillips 2 Froggatt	48,581	Report
26-Feb-49	Derby County	H	2–1	Clarke 2	51,385	Report
26-Mar-49	Leicester City	N	1–3	Harris	62,000	Report

== Appearances ==
Player	Position	League	Goals	Cup	Goals	Games	Goals
(England) Bert Barlow	Inside forward	29	8	5		34	8
(Northern Ireland) Gerry Bowler	Centre half	2				2	
(England) Ernest Butler	Goalkeeper	42		5		47	
(England) Ike Clarke	Inside forward	24	14	5	4	29	18
(Jamaica) Lindy Delapenha	Right winger	2				2	
(England) Jimmy Dickinson	Wing half	41		5		46	
(England) Harry Ferrier	Full back	40		5		45	
(England) Reg Flewin	Centre half	39		5		44	
(England) Jack Froggatt	Left wing	41	15	5	1	46	16
(England) Peter Harris	Right wing	40	18	5	4	45	22
(England) Billy Hindmarsh	Full back	10				10	
(England) Cliff Parker	Winger	5				5	
(England) Len Phillips	Inside forward	40	10	5	6	45	16
(Scotland) Duggie Reid	Inside forward	29	17			29	17
(England) Phil Rookes	Full back	25		1		26	
(Scotland) Jimmy Scoular	Wing half	42		5		47	
(Scotland) Bill Thompson	Wing half	3				3	
(England) Jasper Yeuell	Full back	8		4		12	
