= 1949 FA Charity Shield =

- Event: FA Charity Shield
Portsmouth	Wolverhampton Wanderers
1	1
- Date: 19 October 1949
- Venue: Highbury, London
- Attendance: 35,140

The 1949 FA Charity Shield was the 27th FA Charity Shield, a pre-season exhibition football match between the winners of the previous season's First Division and FA Cup titles. The match took place at Highbury, London, between the league champions Portsmouth and FA Cup winners Wolverhampton Wanderers. The score finished at 1–1, marking the first draw in the Charity Shield and meaning the Shield was shared.

== Match details ==
19 October 1949

Portsmouth	1–1	Wolverhampton Wanderers
Reid 30'		Hancocks 65' (pen.)

Highbury, London
Attendance: 35,140

Portsmouth
Wolverhampton Wanderers

1	(England) Ernest Butler
2	(England) Billy Hindmarsh
3	(England) Harry Ferrier
4	(Scotland) Jimmy Scoular
5	(Scotland) Bill Thompson
6	(England) Jimmy Dickinson
7	(England) Peter Harris
8	(Scotland) Duggie Reid
9	(England) Ike Clarke
10	(England) Bert Barlow
11	(England) Jack Froggatt
Manager:
(England) Bob Jackson

1	(England) Dennis Parsons
2	(England) Laurie Kelly
3	(United States) Terry Springthorpe
4	(England) Eddie Russell
5	(England) Bill Shorthouse
6	(England) Billy Crook
7	(England) Johnny Hancocks
8	(Northern Ireland) Sammy Smyth
9	(England) Jesse Pye
10	(Scotland) Jimmy Dunn
11	(England) Jimmy Mullen
Manager:
(England) Stan Cullis

== See also ==
- The Football League 1948–49
- FA Cup 1948–49
