= Phil Rookes =

English footballer

Personal information
- Full name: Philip William Rookes
- Date of birth: 23 April 1919
- Place of birth: Dulverton, England
- Date of death: 2003 (aged 83–84)
- Position: Full back

Senior career*
Years	Team	Apps	(Gls)
–	Worksop Town		
1936–1938	Bradford City	11	(0)
1938–1951	Portsmouth	114	(0)
1951–1953	Colchester United	68	(0)
–	Chichester City		
- * Club domestic league appearances and goals

Philip William Rookes (23 April 1919 – February 2003) was an English footballer who played as a full back in the Football League.

== Career ==
Born in Dulverton, Somerset, Rookes played for Bradford City, Portsmouth and Colchester United in the Football League.

Rookes joined Bradford City in October 1936 from Worksop Town. He made 11 league and 3 FA Cup appearances, before joining Portsmouth in January 1938.

He was a member of the Portsmouth First Division championship-winning teams of 1948–49 and 1949–50.

=== Club ===
Portsmouth

- Football League First Division Winner (2): 1948–49, 1949–50
- Football League War Cup Winner (1): 1941–42

== Sources ==
- Frost, Terry (1988). Bradford City A Complete Record 1903-1988. Breedon Books Sport. ISBN 0-907969-38-0.
