= Jasper Yeuell =

English footballer (1925–2003)

Personal information
- Date of birth: 23 March 1925
- Place of birth: Bilston, England
- Date of death: 2003 (aged 77–78)
- Position: Full back

Youth career
- –1946: West Bromwich Albion

Senior career*
Years	Team	Apps	(Gls)
1946–1952	Portsmouth	30	(0)
1952–1953	Barnsley	19	(0)
1953	Weymouth		
- * Club domestic league appearances and goals

Jasper Yeuell (23 March 1925 – 2003) was an English professional footballer.

After emerging from the junior ranks of West Bromwich Albion, Yeuell signed professional forms with Portsmouth in 1946. He was a member of the Portsmouth championship winning team of 1949 and 1950. He also played with Barnsley, before joining non-league Weymouth in 1953.
