= Munks =

Munks is a surname. Notable people with the surname include:

- David Munks (born 1947), English footballer
- Sheryl Munks (born 1965), Australian actress
- Jeffrey Munks (born 1995), South African Musician, Composer & Author

== See also ==
- Chipmunks, small, striped squirrels found in North America
- Golders Green Beth Hamedrash, an Ashkenazi Orthodox Jewish congregation located in Golders Green, London, England
- Munk, a surname
