= Ike Clarke =

English footballer and manager

Personal information
- Full name: Isaac Clarke
- Date of birth: 9 January 1915
- Place of birth: Tipton, England
- Date of death: 2 April 2002 (aged 87)
- Place of death: Herne Bay, Kent, England
- Position: Forward

Senior career*
Years	Team	Apps	(Gls)
1937–1947	West Bromwich Albion	108	(39)
1947–1953	Portsmouth	116	(49)
1953–1957	Yeovil Town	103	(49)
Total		327	(137)

Managerial career
- 1953–1957: Yeovil Town (Player-manager)
- 1957–1961: Sittingbourne
- 1961-1968: Canterbury City
- * Club domestic league appearances and goals

Isaac Clarke (9 January 1915 – 2 April 2002) was an English footballer and football manager. He is most notable for scoring the goal which won Portsmouth their first League title.

== Career ==
Clarke, called Ike everywhere he went, was born at Tipton during the First World War on 9 January 1915. He began playing in an amateur Wolverhampton league for Toll End Westley, and then signed as a professional for West Bromwich Albion, then a First Division club, in 1937. Clarke was officially on their books for ten years, but most of that career was lost through the Second World War. By the end of his time there he had played 108 games and scored 39 goals.

As football began again in fits and starts after the War had ended Clarke moved to Portsmouth in November 1947. West Bromwich was in the Second Division by then, and it is recorded that the Fratton Park faithful initially weren't very impressed that £7,000 had been spent on a striker already in his thirties from a lower division. Clarke was to win them over and become one of the most popular players on the side. He was a big brave center-forward in the classic British tradition, but also had a good footballing brain and some skill, and linked up what was the formidable forward line that Pompey boasted at that time. He stayed at Portsmouth for six years and was an important part of the team that won back-to-back Championships in 1948–49 and 1949–50. It was Clarke's winner in a 2–1 victory against Bolton Wanderers on 23 April 1949 that clinched the points that took Pompey to their first-ever First Division title. The following season, Clarke's contribution was greater in Pompey's need to defend the title, he played in 37 games and finished top scorer with 17 goals. Clarke went on to serve Pompey sporadically in the 1950s and in all he clocked up 129 appearances, 116 in the League, and 58 goals, 49 in the League.

In 1953 Clarke gave up playing full-time football at the age of 38 and looked for his first job in management. Yeovil Town in the Southern Football League was advertising for a new manager, The Supporters Club offered to help with the wages of the new appointee, and a tied house was thrown in. On 10 May 1953 Clarke became The Glover's fourth manager since the War. His first season in charge ended with Yeovil finishing third in the Southern League and Clarke himself made 48 appearances scoring 20 goals at the age of 36. The next season Clarke took Yeovil to the Southern League and Southern League cup double. Although Clarke had led Yeovil to their most successful season in terms of trophies just four seasons earlier Clarke was relieved of his managerial duties at the end of the 1956–57 season.

After Yeovil Town Clarke moved to Kent. He took over the helm at Sittingbourne and won the Kent League, Kent League Division One Cup, Kent Senior Cup and the Thames & Medway Combination League Championship. He took Sittingbourne into the Southern League Division One in 1959–60 and they missed out on promotion on goal average and the same fate awaited them the following season, again missing out on promotion to the Premier Division on goal average. He later took charge of Canterbury City, becoming their longest serving manager before retiring to Herne Bay in Kent, where he lived until his death in April 2002 at the age of 87.

== Honours ==
=== Player ===
Portsmouth

- First Division champion: 1948–49, 1949–50
- FA Charity Shield champion: 1949 (Shared)

=== Managerial ===
Yeovil Town (Player-manager)

- Southern League champion: 1954–55
- Southern League Cup champion: 1954–55
- Somerset Professional Cup champion: 1953–54, 1954–55, 1955–56, 1956–57 (Shared)

Sittingbourne

- Kent League champion: 1957–58, 1958–59
- Kent League Division One Cup: 1957–58
- Kent Senior Cup champion: 1957–58
- Thames & Medway Combination League Championship champion: 1958–59

== See also ==
- 1948–49 Portsmouth F.C. season
- 1949–50 Portsmouth F.C. season
