= John McColgan =

Scottish footballer

Personal information
- Full name: John McColgan
- Date of birth: 2 January 1898
- Place of birth: Tollcross, Glasgow, Scotland
- Position: Full-back

Senior career*
Years	Team	Apps	(Gls)
1919–1920	Vale of Clyde		
1920–1923	Albion Rovers		
1923–1930	Portsmouth	190	(0)
1930	Waterford		
Total		190	(0)
- * Club domestic league appearances and goals

John McColgan (2 January 1898–unknown) was a Scottish footballer who played in the Football League for Portsmouth.
