= Bob Jackson (football manager) =

English football manager (died 1968)

Personal information
- Place of birth: Farnworth, England
- Date of death: May 1968
- Place of death: Blackpool, England

Managerial career
- Years: Team
- 1945–1946: Worcester City
- 1947–1952: Portsmouth
- 1952–1955: Hull City

Bob Jackson (died May 1968) was the manager of the English football club Portsmouth from 1947 to 1952. Jackson led Pompey to consecutive First Division titles in the 1948–49 and 1949–50 seasons, the only titles in their history. He departed in the summer of 1952 to take over at ambitious Second Division club Hull City, but could not replicate the success he had at Fratton Park. Jackson died in May 1968.

== Honours ==
Portsmouth

- Football League First Division: 1948–49, 1949–50
- FA Charity Shield: 1949 (shared)

== See also ==
- List of English football championship winning managers
