= Dan Ekner =

Swedish footballer

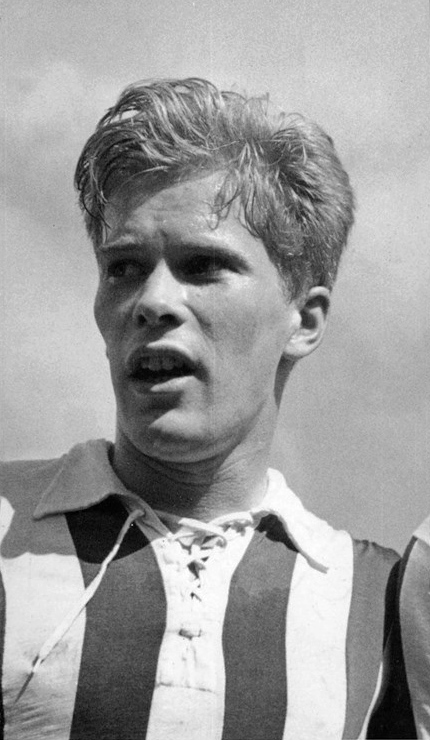
- Ekner in 1950

Personal information
- Full name: Daniel Heimer Ekner
- Date of birth: 5 February 1927
- Place of birth: Gothenburg, Sweden
- Date of death: 17 April 1975 (aged 48)
- Place of death: Gothenburg, Sweden
- Position: Striker

Senior career*
Years	Team	Apps	(Gls)
1945	Örgryte IS		
1945–1949	IS Halmia	75	(16)
1949–1950	IFK Göteborg	19	(12)
1949–1950	Portsmouth F.C.	5	(0)
1950–1951	Olympique de Marseille	27	(8)
1951–1953	Fiorentina	60	(11)
1953–1954	SPAL	31	(5)
1954–1955	Chicago Vikings		
1955–1956	Atlético Madrid	0	(0)
1956–1958	Rot-Weiss Essen	25	(1)
1958–1960	PSV Eindhoven	23	(2)
1960–1962	Örgryte IS	7	(1)
1962–1963	Västra Frölunda IF		

International career
1949	Sweden B	1	(0)
- * Club domestic league appearances and goals

Dan Heimer Ekner (5 February 1927 – 17 April 1975) was a Swedish footballer who played as a striker. He played professionally in England, France, Italy, Spain, Germany, the United States, and the Netherlands during a club career that spanned between 1945 and 1963.

== Club career ==
Ekner was the first Swedish player to play in the Football League when he played five games for Portsmouth during the 1949–50 season during which Portsmouth ended up winning the league title. While at Atletico Madrid, he was part of the team that reached the 1956 Copa del Rey final. He also represented clubs in Italy, the Netherlands, Germany, and the United States during his career.

== International career ==
Ekner appeared once for the Sweden B team in 1949.

== Honours ==
Portsmouth

- Football League First Division: 1949–50
