= 1902–03 Western Football League =

Western Football League
- Season: 1902–03
- Champions: Portsmouth (Division One); Bristol Rovers Reserves (Division Two)

The 1902–03 season was the 11th in the history of the Western Football League.

Like the previous two seasons, Portsmouth were the champions of Division One, and along with all the other members of Division One, also competed in the Southern League during this season. The Division Two champions were Bristol Rovers Reserves.

== Division One ==
One new club joined Division One, which remained at nine clubs after Swindon Town left the league.

- Brentford

Pos	Team	Pld	W	D	L	GF	GA	GR	Pts	Result
1	Portsmouth	16	10	4	2	34	14	2.429	24	
2	Bristol Rovers	16	9	2	5	36	22	1.636	20	
3	Southampton	16	7	6	3	32	20	1.600	20	
4	Tottenham Hotspur	16	6	7	3	20	14	1.429	19	
5	Millwall Athletic	16	6	3	7	23	29	0.793	15	Left league at end of season
6	Reading	16	7	0	9	20	21	0.952	14	
7	Queens Park Rangers	16	6	2	8	18	31	0.581	14	
8	Brentford	16	3	4	9	16	34	0.471	10	
9	West Ham United	16	2	4	10	15	29	0.517	8	

== Division Two ==
No new clubs joined Division Two, which was reduced to eight clubs from nine after Weston-super-Mare left the league.

Pos	Team	Pld	W	D	L	GF	GA	GR	Pts	Result
1	Bristol Rovers Reserves	14	10	2	2	45	10	4.500	22	
2	St George	14	9	1	4	37	25	1.480	19	Left league at end of season
3	Swindon Town Reserves	14	8	0	6	59	24	2.458	16	
4	Bristol East	14	6	3	5	23	27	0.852	15	
5	Staple Hill	14	5	3	6	27	20	1.350	13	
6	Paulton Rovers	14	6	1	7	27	27	1.000	13	
7	Trowbridge Town	14	5	1	8	20	48	0.417	11	
8	Cotham Amateurs	14	1	1	12	14	71	0.197	3	Left league at end of season

Rules for classification: The system of using goal average to separate two teams tied on points was used up to and including the 1976–77 season. The points system: 2 points for a win, 1 point for a draw and 0 points for losing.
