= John Milkins =

English footballer

Personal information
- Full name: Albert John Milkins
- Date of birth: 3 January 1944 (age 82)
- Place of birth: Romford, England
- Height: 6 ft 1/2 in (1.84 m)
- Position: Goalkeeper

Youth career
- 1959–1961: Portsmouth

Senior career*
Years	Team	Apps	(Gls)
1961–1974	Portsmouth	344	(0)
1974–1979	Oxford United	53	(0)
1979–1982	Waterlooville	122	(0)
Total		519	(0)

International career
1961	England Youth	1	

Managerial career
- 1981–1983: Waterlooville
- * Club domestic league appearances and goals

Albert John Milkins is an English retired professional footballer whose career ran from the start of the 1960s to the end of the 1970s.

Born in Romford on 3 January 1944, Milkins won one England Youth cap whilst with his first club Portsmouth, to whom he was to give 15 years of service. He made his debut for the first team in their final match in the English First Division, although he was to wait a further two years for his next appearance. In all Milkins was to make over 300 appearances for Portsmouth and was to prove such a popular player that in 1970 he was awarded the inaugural Player of the Year trophy. The following year he was awarded a testimonial against local rivals Southampton which resulted in a 0–7 defeat. In the 1974 close season he was sold to Oxford United for whom he played sporadically until his last league appearance in May 1979. He then joined now defunct Southern League club Waterlooville and, after two years as first-choice goalkeeper, became player-manager during the 1981–82 season, taking over from John Waugh. At the end of that season he retired from playing but continued as first-team manager until December 1983. During his two years as manager of Waterlooville the club were promoted to the Premier Division, reached the final of the Southern League Cup, and reached the first round proper of the F.A. Cup where they played against league opposition for the only time in their history, losing to Northampton Town after two replays. After being replaced as Waterlooville manager by Ernie Bradwell part-way through the 1983–84 season, Milkins then ran a sports shop/ snooker hall consortium. Milkins has a daughter, Julie, and a son, David, who was also an accomplished footballer, playing as a forward for Waterlooville in the 1980s and 1990s.
