= Len Phillips =

English footballer (1922–2011)

Personal information
- Full name: Leonard Horace Phillips
- Date of birth: 11 September 1922
- Place of birth: Shoreditch, England
- Date of death: 9 December 2011 (aged 89)
- Place of death: Portsmouth, England
- Position: Inside left

Youth career
- Hillside Y.C.

Senior career*
Years	Team	Apps	(Gls)
1941–1946	Royal Marines	xxx	(xxx)
1946–1956	Portsmouth	245	(48)
1956–1959	Poole Town		
1959–1963	Chelmsford City		
1963–1965	Bath City	81	(7)
1965–1966	Ramsgate Athletic		
1966	Waterlooville	23	(8)

International career
1951-1955	England	3	(0)
- * Club domestic league appearances and goals

Leonard Horace Phillips (11 September 1922 – 9 December 2011) was an English professional footballer who played as an inside forward, notably for Portsmouth. He won three caps for the England national team and scored 97 goals.

== Career ==
Phillips was born in Shoreditch, London. At club level, he played his entire professional career for Portsmouth, and was a member of the championship-winning teams of 1949 and 1950.

After his professional career, Phillips went on to play non-league football for Poole Town, Chelmsford City, Bath City and Waterlooville, the latter while working as a lathe operator at De Havilland's works in Portsmouth. He made his last appearance in senior football at the age of 44, in a 3–0 win for Waterlooville against Andover on 24 September 1966. After that, Phillips appeared for several years in occasional charity matches for the Pompey ex-Professionals team.

== Death ==
Phillips died in Portsmouth on 9 December 2011.
