= 1948–49 in English football =

Football in England
- Season: 1948–49

Men's football
- First Division: Portsmouth
- Second Division: Fulham
- FA Cup: Wolves

The 1948–49 season was the 69th season of competitive football in England.

== Overview ==
Portsmouth won the First Division title for the first time with a team of no recognised stars and very few international players. However, it was not the first major honour for the Hampshire club, as they had been the last winners of the FA Cup before the outbreak of the war. They would retain their league title the following season.

Wolverhampton Wanderers, under manager Stan Cullis and captain Billy Wright, won their first major trophy for more than 40 years when they beat Leicester City 3-1 in the final of the FA Cup. This was the beginning of a great run of success for the West Midlands side.

== Honours ==
Competition	Winner	Runner-up
First Division	Portsmouth (1)	Manchester United
Second Division	Fulham	West Bromwich Albion
Third Division North	Hull City	Rotherham United
Third Division South	Swansea City	Reading
FA Cup	Wolverhampton Wanderers (3)	Leicester City
Charity Shield	Arsenal	Manchester United
Home Championship	Scotland	England

Notes = Number in parentheses is the times that club has won that honour. * indicates new record for competition

== Football League ==
=== First Division ===
Pos	Team	Pld	W	D	L	GF	GA	GAv	Pts	Relegation
1	Portsmouth (C)	42	25	8	9	84	42	2.000	58	
2	Manchester United	42	21	11	10	77	44	1.750	53	
3	Derby County	42	22	9	11	74	55	1.345	53	
4	Newcastle United	42	20	12	10	70	56	1.250	52	
5	Arsenal	42	18	13	11	74	44	1.682	49	
6	Wolverhampton Wanderers	42	17	12	13	79	66	1.197	46	
7	Manchester City	42	15	15	12	47	51	0.922	45	
8	Sunderland	42	13	17	12	49	58	0.845	43	
9	Charlton Athletic	42	15	12	15	63	67	0.940	42	
10	Aston Villa	42	16	10	16	60	76	0.789	42	
11	Stoke City	42	16	9	17	66	68	0.971	41	
12	Liverpool	42	13	14	15	53	43	1.233	40	
13	Chelsea	42	12	14	16	69	68	1.015	38	
14	Bolton Wanderers	42	14	10	18	59	68	0.868	38	
15	Burnley	42	12	14	16	43	50	0.860	38	
16	Blackpool	42	11	16	15	54	67	0.806	38	
17	Birmingham City	42	11	15	16	36	38	0.947	37	
18	Everton	42	13	11	18	41	63	0.651	37	
19	Middlesbrough	42	11	12	19	46	57	0.807	34	
20	Huddersfield Town	42	12	10	20	40	69	0.580	34	
21	Preston North End (R)	42	11	11	20	62	75	0.827	33	Relegation to the Second Division
22	Sheffield United (R)	42	11	11	20	57	78	0.731	33	Relegation to the Second Division

Source: World Football
Rules for classification: 1) Points; 2) Goal average; 3) Goals scored
(C) Champions; (R) Relegated

=== Second Division ===
Pos	Team	Pld	W	D	L	GF	GA	GAv	Pts	Qualification or relegation
1	Fulham (C, P)	42	24	9	9	77	37	2.081	57	Promotion to the First Division
2	West Bromwich Albion (P)	42	24	8	10	69	39	1.769	56	Promotion to the First Division
3	Southampton	42	23	9	10	69	36	1.917	55	
4	Cardiff City	42	19	13	10	62	47	1.319	51	
5	Tottenham Hotspur	42	17	16	9	72	44	1.636	50	
6	Chesterfield	42	15	17	10	51	45	1.133	47	
7	West Ham United	42	18	10	14	56	58	0.966	46	
8	Sheffield Wednesday	42	15	13	14	63	56	1.125	43	
9	Barnsley	42	14	12	16	62	61	1.016	40	
10	Luton Town	42	14	12	16	55	57	0.965	40	
11	Grimsby Town	42	15	10	17	72	76	0.947	40	
12	Bury	42	17	6	19	67	76	0.882	40	
13	Queens Park Rangers	42	14	11	17	44	62	0.710	39	
14	Blackburn Rovers	42	15	8	19	53	63	0.841	38	
15	Leeds United	42	12	13	17	55	63	0.873	37	
16	Coventry City	42	15	7	20	55	64	0.859	37	
17	Bradford (Park Avenue)	42	13	11	18	65	78	0.833	37	
18	Brentford	42	11	14	17	42	53	0.792	36	
19	Leicester City	42	10	16	16	62	79	0.785	36	
20	Plymouth Argyle	42	12	12	18	49	64	0.766	36	
21	Nottingham Forest (R)	42	14	7	21	50	54	0.926	35	Relegation to the Third Division South
22	Lincoln City (R)	42	8	12	22	53	91	0.582	28	Relegation to the Third Division North

Rules for classification: 1) Points; 2) Goal average; 3) Goals scored
(C) Champions; (P) Promoted; (R) Relegated

=== Third Division North ===
Pos	Team	Pld	W	D	L	GF	GA	GAv	Pts	Promotion
1	Hull City (C, P)	42	27	11	4	93	28	3.321	65	Promotion to the Second Division
2	Rotherham United	42	28	6	8	90	46	1.957	62	
3	Doncaster Rovers	42	20	10	12	53	40	1.325	50	
4	Darlington	42	20	6	16	83	74	1.122	46	
5	Gateshead	42	16	13	13	69	58	1.190	45	
6	Oldham Athletic	42	18	9	15	75	67	1.119	45	
7	Rochdale	42	18	9	15	55	53	1.038	45	
8	Stockport County	42	16	11	15	61	56	1.089	43	
9	Wrexham	42	17	9	16	56	62	0.903	43	
10	Mansfield Town	42	14	14	14	52	48	1.083	42	
11	Tranmere Rovers	42	13	15	14	46	57	0.807	41	
12	Crewe Alexandra	42	16	9	17	52	74	0.703	41	
13	Barrow	42	14	12	16	41	48	0.854	40	
14	York City	42	15	9	18	74	74	1.000	39	
15	Carlisle United	42	14	11	17	60	77	0.779	39	
16	Hartlepools United	42	14	10	18	45	58	0.776	38	
17	New Brighton	42	14	8	20	46	58	0.793	36	
18	Chester	42	11	13	18	57	56	1.018	35	
19	Halifax Town	42	12	11	19	45	62	0.726	35	
20	Accrington Stanley	42	12	10	20	55	64	0.859	34	
21	Southport	42	11	9	22	45	64	0.703	31	Re-elected
22	Bradford City	42	10	9	23	48	77	0.623	29	Re-elected

Source: rsssf.com
(C) Champions; (P) Promoted

=== Third Division South ===
Pos	Team	Pld	W	D	L	GF	GA	GAv	Pts	Promotion
1	Swansea Town (C, P)	42	27	8	7	87	34	2.559	62	Promotion to the Second Division
2	Reading	42	25	5	12	77	50	1.540	55	
3	Bournemouth & Boscombe Athletic	42	22	8	12	69	48	1.438	52	
4	Swindon Town	42	18	15	9	64	56	1.143	51	
5	Bristol Rovers	42	19	10	13	61	51	1.196	48	
6	Brighton & Hove Albion	42	15	18	9	55	55	1.000	48	
7	Ipswich Town	42	18	9	15	78	77	1.013	45	
8	Millwall	42	17	11	14	63	64	0.984	45	
9	Torquay United	42	17	11	14	65	70	0.929	45	
10	Norwich City	42	16	12	14	67	49	1.367	44	
11	Notts County	42	19	5	18	102	68	1.500	43	
12	Exeter City	42	15	10	17	63	76	0.829	40	
13	Port Vale	42	14	11	17	51	54	0.944	39	
14	Walsall	42	15	8	19	56	64	0.875	38	
15	Newport County	42	14	9	19	68	92	0.739	37	
16	Bristol City	42	11	14	17	44	62	0.710	36	
17	Watford	42	10	15	17	41	54	0.759	35	
18	Southend United	42	9	16	17	41	46	0.891	34	
19	Leyton Orient	42	11	12	19	58	80	0.725	34	
20	Northampton Town	42	12	9	21	51	62	0.823	33	
21	Aldershot	42	11	11	20	48	59	0.814	33	Re-elected
22	Crystal Palace	42	8	11	23	38	76	0.500	27	Re-elected

(C) Champions; (P) Promoted

=== Top goalscorers ===
First Division

- Willie Moir (Bolton Wanderers) – 25 goals

Second Division

- Charlie Wayman (Southampton) – 32 goals

Third Division North

- Wally Ardron (Rotherham United) – 29 goals

Third Division South

- Doug McGibbon (Bournemouth & Boscombe Athletic) – 30 goals
