= Mick Mellows =

English footballer

Personal information
- Full name: Michael Anthony Mellows
- Date of birth: 14 November 1947 (age 78)
- Place of birth: Woking, England
- Position: Winger

Youth career
- 1964–1965: King Alfred College

Senior career*
Years	Team	Apps	(Gls)
1965–1970	Sutton United		
1970–1971	Reading	16	(2)
1971	Winchester City		
1971–1972	Wycombe Wanderers	8	(1)
1973–1978	Portsmouth	181	(16)
1978–1982	Waterlooville	153	(33)

International career
1969–1971	England Amateur	15	
- * Club domestic league appearances and goals

Michael Anthony Mellows is an English former footballer. He was an England Amateur international, who later played professionally for Reading and Portsmouth. Born in Woking, Mellows attended Sutton Grammar School for Boys and played firstly for Sutton United before going to train as a teacher at King Alfred College, Winchester. During this time he played in the 1969 FA Amateur Cup Final and made 15 international appearances for the England national amateur football team. While playing for the college he came to the notice of many league scouts and eventually signed for Reading in September 1970, for whom he played 17 games (scoring twice). After his time with the "Biscuitmen", he had spells with Winchester City and Wycombe Wanderers, before signing for Portsmouth in September 1973 as one of new chairman John Deacon's promised additions to what had been the previous season a very threadbare squad. He came on to make his debut as a substitute in an away victory versus Sheffield Wednesday in October that year and was to remain a regular for the next five years, even winning the clubs coveted "Player of the Year" trophy in 1975. Somewhat a conundrum to the Fratton Faithful his last appearance was at Rotherham on the last day of the 1977/78 season. Mellows then joined Waterlooville and played for them in the Southern League until retiring from football in 1982.

A devout Christian, Mellows now runs (with Linvoy Primus) "Faith and Football"- a community initiative which reaches out through sport to the city's youth and disadvantaged founded in 2002. Initiatives conducted by "Faith and Football" include the "Bring your Beans" initiative, which consists of people bringing beans for distribution for the less fortunate. The organisation also undertakes various charitable missions.

== Personal life ==
Mick has a son, Joseph "Joey" Mellows, who received media attention during the 2019 Major League Baseball season for attempting to watch all 162 non-playoff games.
