= David Munks =

English footballer

Personal information
- Date of birth: 29 April 1947 (age 79)
- Place of birth: Sheffield, England
- Position: Defender

Youth career
- 1962–1965: Sheffield United

Senior career*
Years	Team	Apps	(Gls)
1965–1969	Sheffield United	112	(1)
1969–1973	Portsmouth	137	(2)
1973–1974	Swindon Town	21	(0)
1974–1975	Exeter City	20	(0)

International career
1965	England Youth	2	
- * Club domestic league appearances and goals

David Munks (born 29 April 1947) is an English former footballer whose career ran from the mid-1960s to the mid-1970s. Born in Sheffield on 29 April 1947 Munks won two England Youth caps whilst with his first club Sheffield United . The following month he broke into the first team for the first time during a tour of New Zealand. In all Munks was to make over 100 appearances for The Blades before moving to Portsmouth in the 1969 close season. He was to prove such a popular player on the south coast that in 1971 he was awarded the title of Portsmouth Player of the Year. Change, however, was afoot at Fratton Park with new chairman John Decon sanctioning the purchase of talented new defenders Paul Went and Malcolm Manley. Costs soon spiralled and Munks was one of the first of a cluster of players to leave to offset the huge new wage bills. In December 1973 he signed for a relegation threatened Swindon but was used inexplicably as a midfielder. Not surprisingly this tactical experiment did not enhance a poor side and he was released at the end of the season when they were finally relegated. Initially loaned to Exeter City in the summer of 1974 he signed for them on a permanent basis in December of that year. However, his league career was ended with a knee injury the following year and in 1976 he left the game.
