= Jack Froggatt =

English footballer

Personal information
- Date of birth: 17 November 1922
- Place of birth: Sheffield, England
- Date of death: 17 February 1993 (aged 70)
- Place of death: England
- Position: Outside left

Senior career*
Years	Team	Apps	(Gls)
1946–1954	Portsmouth	279	(65)
1954–1957	Leicester City	143	(18)
1957–1963	Kettering Town	220	(57)

International career
1949–1953	England	13	(2)

Managerial career
- 1958–1961: Kettering Town
- * Club domestic league appearances and goals

Jack Froggatt (17 November 1922 – 17 February 1993) was an English footballer.

== Career ==
Coming from a footballing family, Froggatt started his football career in 1945, whilst in the RAF. Froggatt's uncle, Frank and cousin, Redfern Froggatt both played for Sheffield Wednesday, with the latter racking up 434 games for The Owls.

Previously working in his father's butcher shop, the Sheffield-born winger signed for Portsmouth as a centre-half but managed to persuade manager Jack Tinn to play him as an outside-left. Froggatt crowned his Pompey debut in 1945 with a second-half goal at The Dell in a War League South match with South Coast derby rivals Southampton and went on to become a regular goalscorer. He had alarming speed, excellent ball control and was very strong in the air, making him one of the most versatile players Pompey have ever had.

A stocky player, who was known for his robust running and sharp shooting, 'Jolly Jack' earned his first cap for England on 6 November 1949, where he scored on his international debut, from the outside-left position in a 9–2 victory over Northern Ireland at Maine Road.

For his club, Froggatt played in a half-back line alongside Jimmy Scoular and Jimmy Dickinson as Pompey won consecutive first division titles in 1948–49 and 1949–50.

With Duggie Reid taking the number 5 shirt in Froggatt's last season, Froggatt reverted to the wing again. Reluctantly leaving in March 1954, the winger went on to play 143 matches for Leicester City, scoring 18 goals. In September 1957 Froggatt went on to sign for Kettering Town for a fee of £6000.

Froggatt made his debut at Rockingham Road in November 1957 in the 3–1 win over Barry Town in front of 3,819, he scored his first goal for the club against Cheltenham Town two weeks later in the home 2–1 win.

During his Poppies career Froggatt scored three hat-tricks, the first in the 6-4 thriller against Spalding United in the 1st Qualifying round of the FA Cup, in October 1958. His second hat-trick was scored in April 1959 in the Southern League North West Division against Kidderminster Harriers as the Poppies ran out 4–3 victors at Rockingham Road during their promotion season. His final trio came against Gloucester City on 15 April 1961 as Kettering ran out a 6–1 score line in the Southern League Division One, a Championship season as the Poppies returned to the Southern League Premier.

Froggatt was the player/manager of the club from January 1958, replacing Harry Mather until September 1961. Under his tenure in the hot seat he saw promotion, a relegation and a Championship season. Froggatt was succeeded by Wally Akers, but he still continued to play for the Poppies. His final league game for the Poppies came in the 1–3 defeat by Chelmsford City on 23 March 1963.

Froggatt's 20-year football career came to an end on 6 May 1963, a benefit match against one of his former clubs, Portsmouth. 1,800 turned out to see Pompey race into a 4–0 lead after just 35 minutes, before goals from Dennis Randall, Froggatt and George Armour made the score more respectable.

Retiring from football, Froggatt returned to Portsmouth to become a publican. For 22 years, he kept the Manor House in Cosham, The Milton Arms near Fratton Park and a hotel in Partridge Green, West Sussex.
