= Peter Harris (footballer) =

English footballer (1925–2003)

Personal information
- Full name: Peter Philip Harris
- Date of birth: 19 December 1925
- Place of birth: Portsmouth, England
- Date of death: 2 January 2003 (aged 77)
- Place of death: Hayling Island, England
- Position: Outside right

Senior career*
Years	Team	Apps	(Gls)
1946–1960	Portsmouth	479	(194)

International career
1949–1954	England	2	(0)
- * Club domestic league appearances and goals

Peter Philip Harris (19 December 1925 – 2 January 2003) was a footballer who played for Portsmouth in the 1940s and 1950s.

Harris was an outside right, and he played a crucial role in Pompey's Football league title-winning sides of 1948–49 and 1949–50.

He made 479 Football League appearances for Portsmouth, scoring 194 goals.

Only the competition from Stanley Matthews and Tom Finney, in an era before substitutions were introduced to the game, prevented Harris earning more than two caps for the England national football team. He made his England debut against Ireland in a 2–0 defeat in September 1949.

== Career statistics ==
Appearances and goals by club, season and competition
Club	Season	League		FA Cup		Other		Total	
Club	Season	Apps	Goals	Apps	Goals	Apps	Goals	Apps	Goals
Portsmouth	1946–47	4	1	0	0	–	–	4	1
Portsmouth	1947–48	40	13	2	1	–	–	42	14
Portsmouth	1948–49	40	17	5	5	–	–	45	22
Portsmouth	1949–50	40	16	4	1	1	0	45	17
Portsmouth	1950–51	36	5	1	0	–	–	37	5
Portsmouth	1951–52	40	9	4	1	–	–	44	10
Portsmouth	1952–53	41	23	1	0	–	–	42	23
Portsmouth	1953–54	40	20	7	5	–	–	47	25
Portsmouth	1954–55	41	23	1	0	–	–	42	23
Portsmouth	1955–56	41	23	2	1	–	–	43	24
Portsmouth	1956–57	39	11	2	2	–	–	41	13
Portsmouth	1957–58	40	18	2	2	–	–	42	20
Portsmouth	1958–59	26	13	4	0	–	–	30	13
Portsmouth	1959–60	11	1	–	–	–	–	11	1
Career total		479	193	35	18	1	0	515	211
