= Jimmy Dickinson =

English footballer (1925–1982)

Jimmy Dickinson MBE
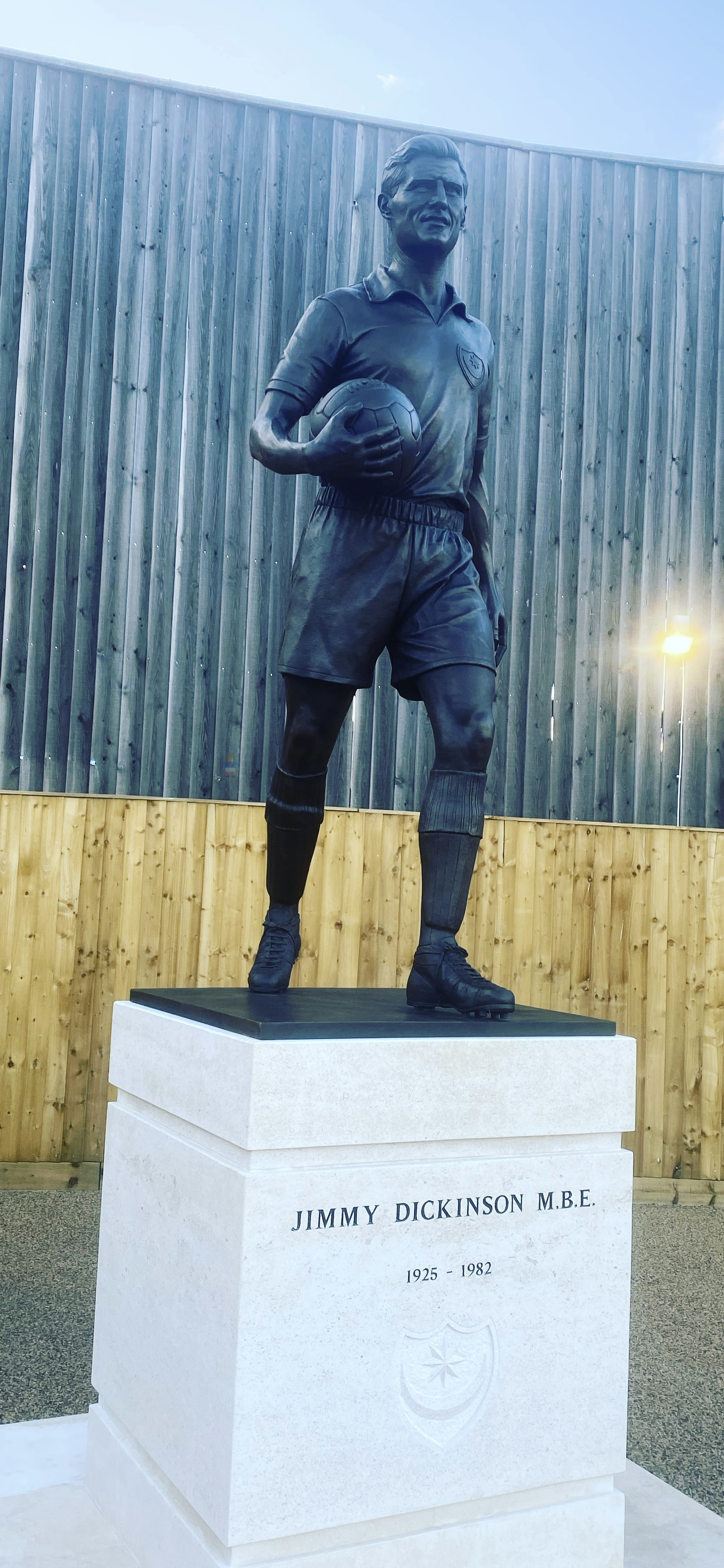

Personal information
- Full name: James William Dickinson
- Date of birth: 24 April 1925
- Place of birth: Alton, Hampshire, England
- Date of death: 8 November 1982 (aged 57)
- Place of death: Alton, Hampshire, England
- Position: Left half

Senior career*
Years	Team	Apps	(Gls)
1946–1965	Portsmouth	764	(9)

International career
1949–1956	England	48	(0)

Managerial career
- 1977–1979: Portsmouth
- * Club domestic league appearances and goals

James William Dickinson MBE (24 April 1925 – 8 November 1982) was an English footballer who played as a left half.

Dickinson holds the record for number of league appearances for Portsmouth (764). Only Swindon Town's John Trollope and Milton Keynes Dons' Dean Lewington have made more appearances for a single club.

He signed for Portsmouth as a trainee and made his debut in 1946 against Blackburn Rovers. Settling into the side quickly at either wing-half or left-half, he was part of the team that won successive league championships in 1948–49 and 1949–50. His performances earned him a call-up to the England national team. He went on to win 48 caps for England, making him Portsmouth's most capped English player of all time. During his record 845 club appearances for Pompey and his 48 England caps he was never once booked or sent off, earning him the nickname 'Gentleman Jim'.

As of 2022, he remains the only England player ever to have scored an own goal at the FIFA World Cup, scoring past his own goalkeeper in a 4–4 draw against Belgium in 1954.

Awarded the MBE for services to football in 1964, he played his last match for Pompey a year later, helping Pompey to a 1–1 end-of-season draw at Northampton Town that secured safety from relegation. And when he retired from playing, his association with the club continued. He served Pompey as public relations officer and then secretary before accepting the position of manager in May 1977. Relegation from the Third Division was avoided, but the next year Pompey dropped down a league.

After three heart attacks, Dickinson died aged 57 in 1982. The famous 'Pompey Chimes' were played in St Mary's Church in Fratton at a packed memorial service. He is buried in Alton Cemetery.

In 1998, he was included on the list of 100 Legends produced to celebrate the centenary of the Football League.

Dickinson's image can be seen in the seating in the Fratton End stand in Fratton Park.

In his home town of Alton there is a pub named The Gentleman Jim and Dickinson Road in Portsmouth was named in his honour.

On 23 September 2023, a bronze statue of Dickinson by Douglas Jennings was unveiled at Fratton Park by Jimmy's son Andrew Dickinson and former Portsmouth goalkeeper, Alan Knight. The statue was commissioned by the Pompey Supporters' Trust and crowdfunded by fans of the club.

== Career statistics ==
Appearances and goals by club, season and competition
Club	Season	League			National cup		League cup		Total	
Club	Season	Division	Apps	Goals	Apps	Goals	Apps	Goals	Apps	Goals
Portsmouth	1946–47	First Division	40	0	2	0	–		42	0
Portsmouth	1947–48	First Division	42	0	2	0	–		44	0
Portsmouth	1948–49	First Division	41	0	5	0	–		46	0
Portsmouth	1949–50	First Division	40	0	5	0	–		45	0
Portsmouth	1950–51	First Division	41	2	1	0	–		42	2
Portsmouth	1951–52	First Division	40	0	4	0	–		44	0
Portsmouth	1952–53	First Division	40	1	2	0	–		42	1
Portsmouth	1953–54	First Division	40	1	7	0	–		47	1
Portsmouth	1954–55	First Division	25	0	0	0	–		25	0
Portsmouth	1955–56	First Division	39	1	2	1	–		41	2
Portsmouth	1956–57	First Division	42	0	2	0	–		44	0
Portsmouth	1957–58	First Division	42	2	2	0	–		44	2
Portsmouth	1958–59	First Division	39	2	4	0	–		43	2
Portsmouth	1959–60	Second Division	42	0	1	0	–		43	0
Portsmouth	1960–61	Second Division	40	0	1	0	4	0	45	0
Portsmouth	1961–62	Third Division	46	0	1	0	4	0	51	0
Portsmouth	1962–63	Second Division	42	0	5	0	3	0	50	0
Portsmouth	1963–64	Second Division	42	0	2	0	1	0	45	0
Portsmouth	1964–65	Second Division	41	0	2	0	2	0	45	0
Career total			764	9	50	1	14	0	828	10
