= Ernie Butler (footballer, born 1919) =

English footballer

Personal information
- Full name: Ernest Butler
- Date of birth: 13 May 1919
- Place of birth: Box, Wiltshire, England
- Date of death: 31 January 2002 (aged 82)
- Position: Goalkeeper

Youth career
- Box

Senior career*
Years	Team	Apps	(Gls)
1946–1953	Portsmouth	222	(0)
- * Club domestic league appearances and goals

Ernest Butler (13 May 1919 – 31 January 2002) was an English footballer.

He signed for Portsmouth from Bath City and served in the Royal Navy during the Second World War and was a guest goalkeeper for Tranmere Rovers when stationed on Merseyside . Whilst at Portsmouth he won back-to-back Football League Championships.
