= Duggie Reid =

Scottish footballer (1917–2002)

Personal information
- Full name: John Douglas Jamieson Reid
- Date of birth: 3 October 1917
- Place of birth: West Kilbride, Ayrshire, Scotland
- Date of death: 8 February 2002 (aged 84)
- Place of death: Park Gate, Hampshire, England
- Height: 6 ft 1 in (1.85 m)
- Position: Inside forward

Senior career*
Years	Team	Apps	(Gls)
1936–1946	Stockport	84	(23)
1946–1956	Portsmouth	307	(129)
1956–19??	Tonbridge		
- * Club domestic league appearances and goals

John Douglas Jamieson Reid (3 October 1917 – 8 February 2002) was a Scottish footballer. An inside forward, he played for Stockport County and Portsmouth.

Born in West Kilbride, Reid started his working life as an apprentice plumber in Manchester. After a spell in amateur football, he joined Stockport County, and turned professional in 1936. Playing at wing-half, Reid was part of the team that won Division Three North.

In 1946, at the age of 28, he was sold to Portsmouth for £7,000. Although Portsmouth fans were initially sceptical, he won them over by scoring 29 goals in his first season, ending it as the club's top scorer. Known for his blistering shots, his nickname; 'thunderboots' was re-affirmed when, at Fratton Park he put the ball through the net and into the crowd when scoring a penalty against Manchester City. His goals helped Portsmouth win First Division titles in 1948–49 and 1949–50, with a hat-trick in a 5–1 final-day win in the 1949–50 season helping Portsmouth claim the title on goal average.

With his Portsmouth days over, Reid moved to non-league team Tonbridge in 1956 before returning to the south coast once again as Portsmouths groundsman, a post he held until 1978. Reid also ran a hostel for the club's young footballers in Southsea.

Reid's son David also played for England at amateur level.
