= Portsmouth F.C. =

Association football club in the south of England

Portsmouth
- Full name: Portsmouth Football Club
- Nickname: Pompey
- Founded: 5 April 1898; 128 years ago as "Portsmouth Football and Athletic Company Limited"
- Ground: Fratton Park
- Capacity: 20,867
- Coordinates: 50°47′47″N 1°3′50″W
- Owner-Chairman: Michael Eisner
- Chief Executive: Andrew Cullen
- Head coach: John Mousinho
- League: EFL Championship
- 2025–26: EFL Championship, 18th of 24
- Website: portsmouthfc.co.uk
Home colours	Away colours	Third colours

Portsmouth Football Club is a professional association football club based in Portsmouth, Hampshire, England. The team is currently competing in the EFL Championship, the second level of the English football league system. The club's home football ground is Fratton Park, located in the Milton area of the city and has an all-seated capacity for 20,867 supporters. Portsmouth are nicknamed Pompey, a local nickname used by both His Majesty's Naval Base, Portsmouth and the city of Portsmouth. The club adopted blue shirts in 1912 and have mostly used a combination of white shorts and red socks since 1946.

Founded on 5 April 1898, Portsmouth began their early history in the Southern and Western leagues, before being elected into the English Football League and newly formed Third Division in 1920. Portsmouth won two promotions in 1924 and 1927 to reach the First Division, becoming the first football club south of London to do so. After finishing runners-up in two FA Cup finals in 1929 and 1934, Portsmouth won for the first time in 1939. Normal professional football in England was suspended in September 1939 because of the outbreak of World War II, meaning Portsmouth retained the FA Cup trophy for seven consecutive years (the record) until the 1946 FA Cup final.

After World War II, Portsmouth became League Champions of England in two successive 1948–49 and 1949–50 First Division seasons. However, Portsmouth's 32 consecutive years in the First Division ended with relegation to the Second Division in 1959 and was followed by another relegation to the Third Division in 1961. In 1978, Portsmouth were relegated to the Fourth Division (formed in 1958) for the first time before earning three promotions in 1980, 1983 and 1987. After one brief season in the 1987-88 First Division, Portsmouth would remain in the second tier for fifteen consecutive years until 2003.

Portsmouth became champions of the 2002–03 Football League First Division (restructured as the second tier in 1992) and were promoted to the first tier, now known as the Premier League. Portsmouth won the FA Cup for a second time in the 2008 FA Cup final. Portsmouth's seven-year stay in the Premier League ended in 2009–10 with relegation, signalling the beginning of a difficult period during which the club entered financial administration twice and were relegated three times in 2010, 2012 and 2013. After the club was purchased by the Pompey Supporters Trust in 2013, Pompey would begin to recover financially and won the League Two title in 2016–17 and the League One title in 2023–24.

Portsmouth are one of only five English football clubs to have been champions of all four tiers of the professional English football pyramid. Portsmouth's arch-rivals are Southampton, a rivalry based in part on geographic proximity and both cities' respective maritime histories. Portsmouth are also the only professional football club in England which is not located on mainland Great Britain, as the city of Portsmouth and their Fratton Park home football ground are both located on Portsea Island.

== History ==
=== 1898–1920: Founding of Portsmouth F.C. and early years ===
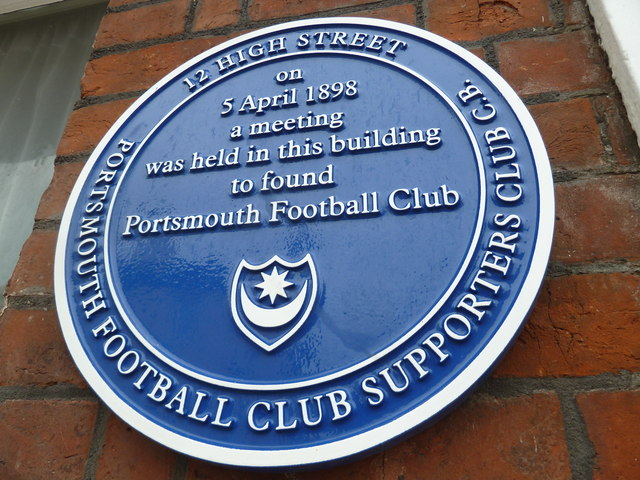
12 High Street, Old Portsmouth

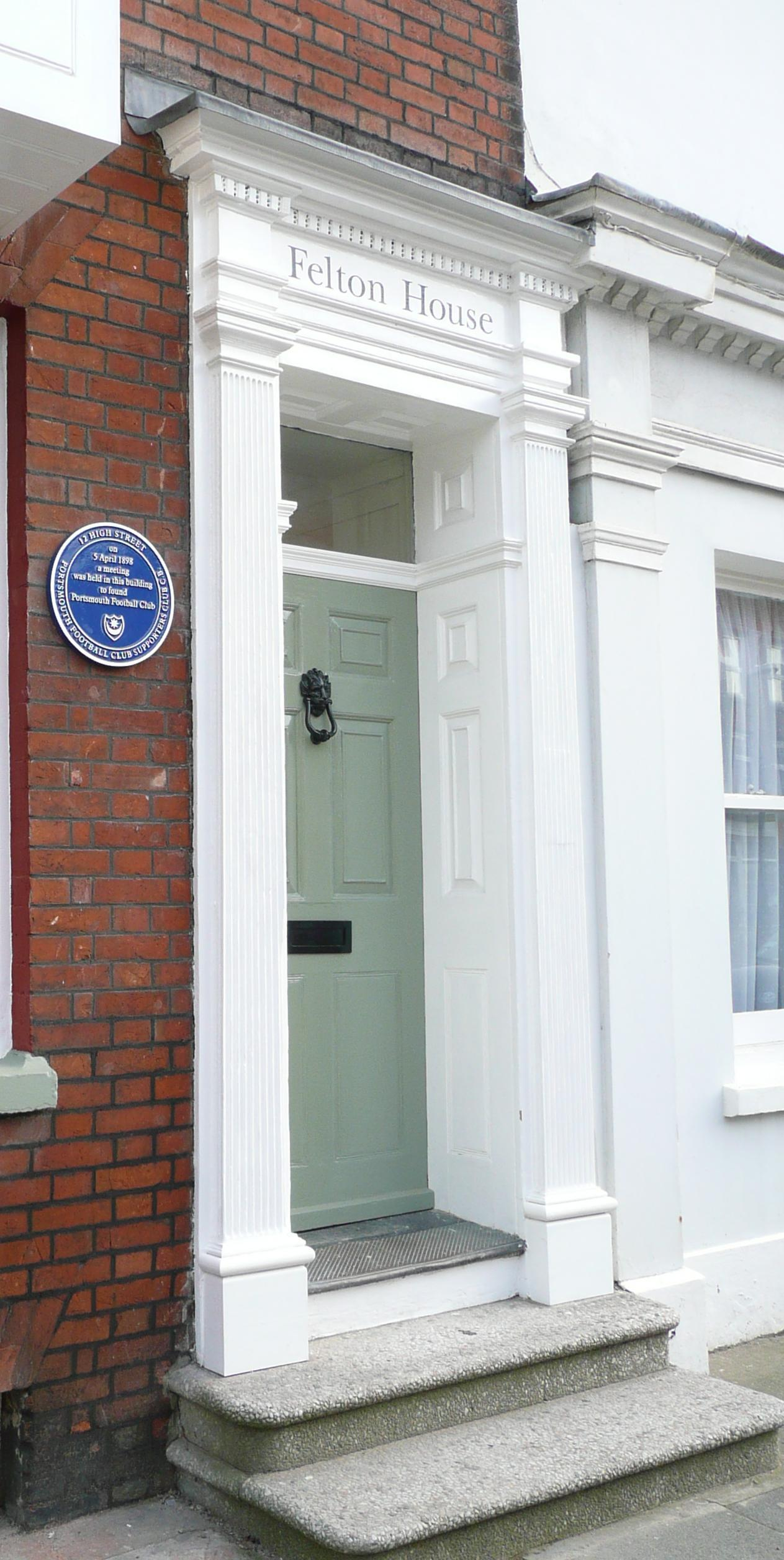
A Blue Plaque on the wall of 12 High Street, Old Portsmouth (Alderman John E. Pink's solicitors' office building) commemorates the founding on 5 April 1898.

Portsmouth F.C. were formed on 5 April 1898, at 12 High Street, Old Portsmouth, as "The Portsmouth Football and Athletic Company", with John Brickwood as chairman. Although the founding of Portsmouth F.C. had been agreed on 5 April 1898, a football ground or a team of players did not exist until 1899.

In 1899, work began on developing a plot of former agricultural land near Goldsmith Avenue, Milton, Portsmouth into a new football ground, bought in 1898 from the local Goldsmith farming family. The new football ground was to be named Fratton Park after the nearby and convenient Fratton railway station. Frank Brettell was announced as Portsmouth Football Club's first manager-secretary in February 1899. A bold and ambitious application for Portsmouth's direct entry into the Southern League First Division, without the usual probationary period in the lower divisions, was accepted, and the club joined the Southern Football League Division One for the 1899–1900 season.

Portsmouth's first 1899–1900 season in the Southern Football League Division One was successful, with the club winning 20 out of 28 league matches, earning them the runner-up spot in the table behind champions, Tottenham Hotspur. In their second 1900–01 Southern Football League Division One season, Portsmouth finished in third place and joined the 1900–01 Western Football League, where they finished as Division One champions. Portsmouth won the 1901–02 Southern Football League championship title but were not promoted. In the 1902–03 Western Football League, Portsmouth won the Division One championship for a third consecutive season.

In the 1906–07 Western Football League, the top Division One was split into equal 'A' and 'B' sections, with a play-off between the two section winners to decide a Division One champion. In their last Western Football League appearance, Portsmouth finished in fourth position of the 'B' section of Division One. At the end of the season, all fourteen members of the split 'A' and 'B' sections of Division One resigned from the Western Football League. Portsmouth ended their season in sixth place before the following season saw the team relegated. A severe financial crisis struck between seasons and a public appeal for funds in May 1911 kept the club afloat.

The team finished second place in the 1911–12 Southern Football League Division Two and were promoted as runners-up. However, the club's finances were in trouble again, with losses and debts increasing to £10,000. A shareholders meeting was called on 8 May 1912, where George Lewin Oliver, one of the original founders and directors, proposed that "The Portsmouth Football and Athletic Company" should be wound up and replaced with a more business orientated company. The original company was then liquidated to remove the debt and on 27 July 1912, the "Portsmouth Football Company Ltd" was formed as the new parent company of Portsmouth F.C., with substantial financial guarantees given by the board of directors. The original 1898 founding director George Lewin Oliver became the new Portsmouth F.C. chairman.

Football was suspended during the First World War. Following the resumption of matches in the 1919–20 season, Portsmouth won the Southern League championship for the second time. Portsmouth were then elected to the Football League Third Division as founder members.

Chart of table positions for Portsmouth since joining the Football League.

=== 1920–1939: Establishment in Football League, FA Cup triumph ===
Competing in the Football League Third Division, Portsmouth claimed the title in the 1923–24 season. Debuting in the Second Division for the first time, they finished in fourth place. Portsmouth won promotion to the First Division by finishing runners-up in the 1926–27 season and in the process, recording their club record win in a 9–1 victory over Notts County. Portsmouth's debut season in the 1927–28 First Division was a struggle, finishing one point and one place above relegation. Despite their difficulties in the top flight, Portsmouth reached the FA Cup final for the first time, which they lost to Bolton Wanderers in 1929.

From 1929 to 1934, Portsmouth had become a regular top-half table finisher in the First Division. The 1933–34 season saw Portsmouth again reach the FA Cup final for a second time but lost to Manchester City. Having established themselves in the top flight, the 1938–39 season saw Portsmouth reach the FA Cup final. This was indeed third time lucky, as Portsmouth managed to defeat Wolverhampton Wanderers 4–1. The start of World War II in 1939 resulted in the suspension of the FA Cup competition for the duration, so Portsmouth held the trophy until it resumed in 1945–46.

The new 1939–40 season was cut short with the start of World War Two. However, football competitions did take place during the war, with the Football League being split into ten regional mini leagues, with Portsmouth in 'League South' along with an annual national cup competition, the Football League War Cup. In 1942, Portsmouth reached the London War Cup final. Portsmouth progressed to the 1942 London War Cup final at Wembley Stadium, but were beaten by Brentford. During his wartime visits to Portsmouth, Field Marshal Montgomery became interested in Portsmouth Football Club and was made honorary President of Portsmouth F.C. in 1944 (until 1961).

=== 1946–1979: Post-war years ===
The Football League finally resumed in 1946–47. Portsmouth won the First Division title in the 1948–49 season. Bob Jackson's Portsmouth side beat Aston Villa 5–1 on the last day of the following 1949–50 season, winning the Football League title again for a second consecutive season – on goal average. In the following 1950–51 season, Portsmouth finished in 7th position. After narrowly avoiding relegation in previous seasons, Portsmouth finished bottom of the First Division at the end of the 1958–59 season, ending their 32-year stay in the First Division.

In the 1960–61 season Portsmouth finished second-to-last place in the Second Division relegation zone and were relegated once again to the Third Division. Under the guidance of George Smith, Portsmouth were promoted back to the Second Division at the first time of asking, winning the Third Division title. Despite limited financial means, manager George Smith maintained Portsmouth's Second Division status throughout the rest of the 1960s. Portsmouth finished bottom of the Second Division in the 1975–76 season and were relegated down to the Third Division. In November of the 1976–77 Third Division season, the club found itself needing to raise £25,000 to pay off debts and so avoid bankruptcy. With players having to be sold to ease the club's financial situation, and no money available for replacements, Portsmouth were forced to rely on inexperienced young players and ended the 1976–77 season only one place and one point above the Third Division's relegation zone but were relegated at the end of the new 1977–78 season, finishing in bottom place.

=== 1979–2003 ===
Under Frank Burrows' new management, Portsmouth gained promotion back to the Third Division after finishing in 4th place in the 1979–80 season. Portsmouth would take three seasons before in 1983, Portsmouth claimed their Third Division championship title, gaining promotion back into the Second Division. In the 1986–87 Second Division season, Portsmouth finished as runners-up behind Derby County, gaining promotion back to the First Division for the first time since the 1958–59 season. By the middle of the new 1987–88 First Division season, the club was again in financial trouble with the ground in a poor condition. Portsmouth were relegated straight back down to the Second Division. The summer of 1988 saw chairman John Deacon sell the club to London-based businessman and former Queens Park Rangers chairman, Jim Gregory.

The club's parent company had a name change from 'Portsmouth Football Company Limited' to 'Portsmouth Football Club Limited' on 23 January 1989. Portsmouth ended the season only two places above the relegation zone. The 1992–93 Football League season saw a major restructuring of the English football "pyramid" system, with the new FA Premier League becoming the new first tier and the First Division becoming the second tier. Therefore, Portsmouth played in the new "First Division" but missed out on automatic promotion by virtue of scoring only one fewer goal than second-placed West Ham United. In the subsequent promotion play-offs, Portsmouth lost 3–2 on aggregate to Leicester City.

Terry Venables took over as chairman in February 1997 after buying a 51 per cent controlling share in the club for £1. Venables sold his shareholding back to Martin Gregory in 1998. Alan Ball then returned as manager for the second time on 26 January 1998. Relegation to the third tier was avoided on the last day of the season – by 1 point. Portsmouth's centenary season, 1998–99, saw a financial crisis hit the club, and in December 1998 Portsmouth went into financial administration. Serbian-born US businessman Milan Mandarić decided to buy Portsmouth in May 1999. Alan Ball was sacked on 9 December 1999 during the 1999–2000 season with the club near the bottom of the table. Tony Pulis steered the club to safety. Portsmouth escaped relegation on the last day of the 2000–01 season when they won their final game and Huddersfield Town lost theirs, keeping Portsmouth up at their expense. A week before the new season began, 25-year-old Portsmouth goalkeeper Aaron Flahavan was killed in a car crash on 5 August 2001 with the club retiring his number 1 shirt for the season. Harry Redknapp became manager in 2002. After a 17th-place finish, he led Pompey to the First Division title in 2002–03, after an absence of fifteen seasons from the first tier.

=== 2003–2017: Premier League and decline ===
In Portsmouth's Premiership debut season in 2003–04, the partnership of Harry Redknapp and Jim Smith resulted in a 13th place final position at the end of the season. Almost halfway through the following 2004–05 season in the Premiership, Harry Redknapp unexpectedly walked out on Portsmouth in November 2004 after a row with chairman Milan Mandarić. Velimir Zajec then replaced Redknapp as Portsmouth manager, but in April 2005, Zajec was replaced by Frenchman Alain Perrin. Perrin managed to secure Portsmouth's Premiership status with a few games of the season left. During the 2005–06 season, Alain Perrin was sacked with Harry Redknapp then making a surprise return to manage Portsmouth again after leaving relegated Southampton. In January 2006, Portsmouth were sold by Milan Mandarić and bought by businessman Alexandre Gaydamak. The club survived their third season in the Premier League one place above the relegation zone in 17th position. With large amounts of money available for Redknapp to make record signings, the club finished the 2006–07 season in the top half of the table for the first time since their promotion, in ninth position.

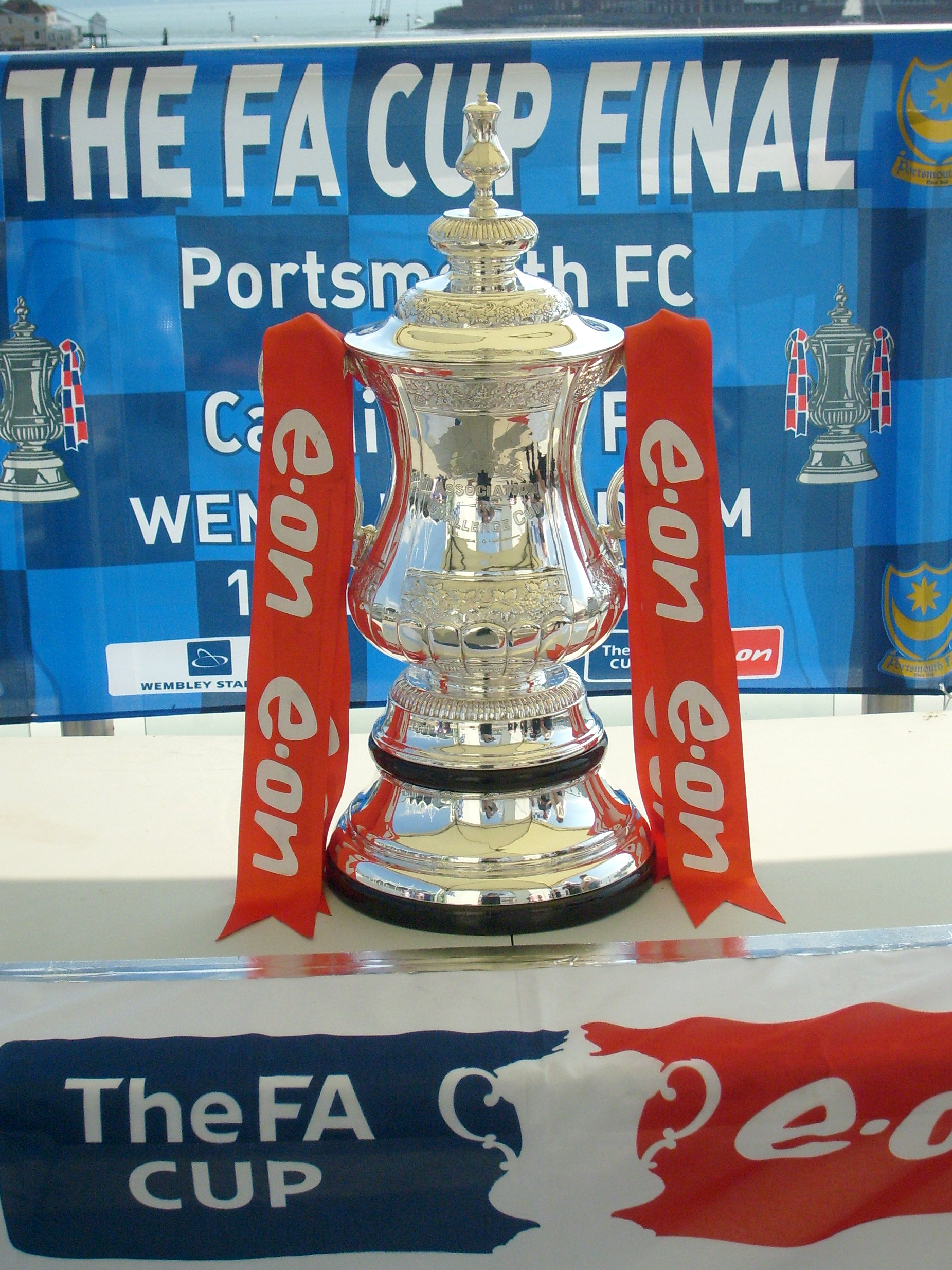
Portsmouth won the FA Cup for the second time in 2008

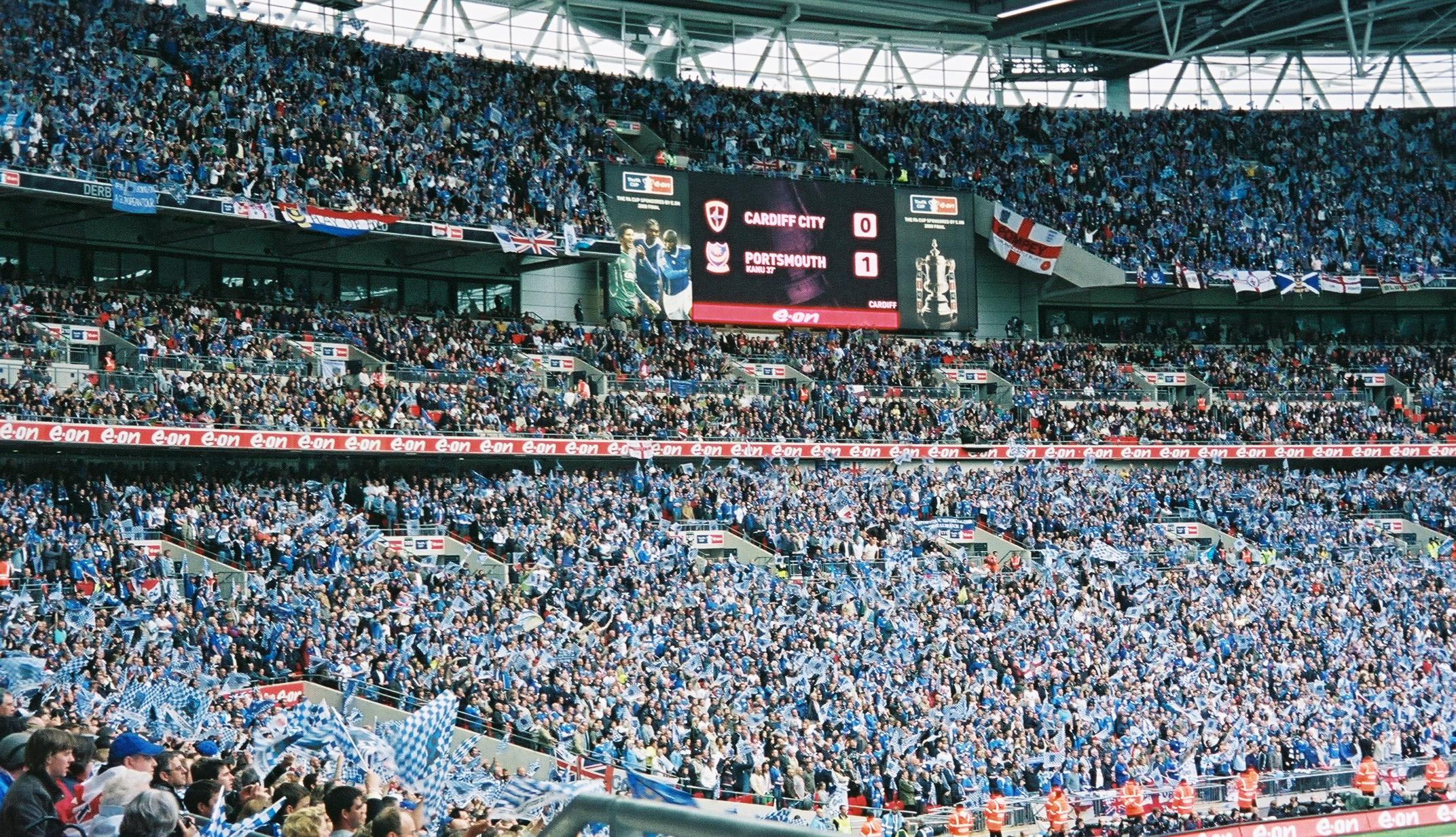
The scoreboard at the end of the 2008 FA Cup final, in which Portsmouth beat Cardiff City 1–0

The following 2007–08 season, Portsmouth finished eighth in the Premier League and defeated Cardiff City in the FA Cup final 1–0. This marked the club’s first FA Cup final since 1939.

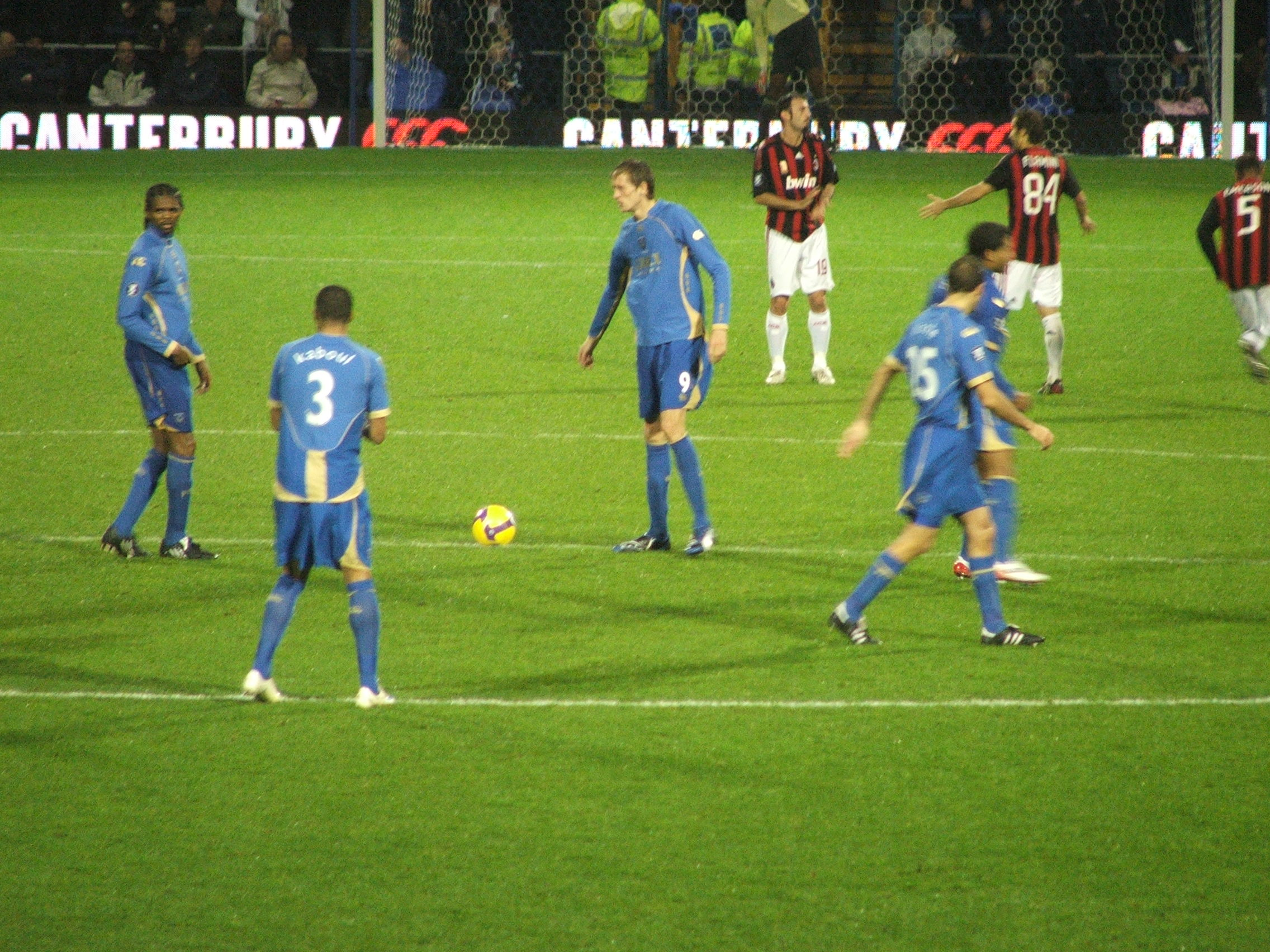
International strikers Peter Crouch and Nwankwo Kanu kick off for Portsmouth in their UEFA Cup match against Milan

The FA Cup win had also earned Portsmouth a place in the 2008–09 UEFA Cup, the club's first time playing European football. On 25 October 2008, Redknapp left Portsmouth for a second time, leaving his assistant Tony Adams to be promoted to the managerial role. On 27 November 2008, Portsmouth drew 2–2 with AC Milan, going 2–0 up, but conceding two goals later in the game. Adams was dismissed in February 2009. Youth team coach Paul Hart took over as manager until the end of the season, eventually finishing in 14th place. Because of the financial problems suffered by the club, Portsmouth were forced to sell several of their top players and high earners. Al Fahim completed the takeover on 26 August 2009. As the early stages of the 2009–10 season progressed, the finances dried up and the club admitted on 1 October that some of their players and staff had not been paid. Owing to the financial difficulties, the Premier League placed the club under a transfer embargo.

Avram Grant took over at Portsmouth on 26 November 2009, following the dismissal of Hart. HM Revenue and Customs (HMRC) filed a winding-up petition against Portsmouth at the High Court of Justice on 23 December 2009. In March 2010, this winding-up petition was dropped, leaving Portsmouth with a nine-point penalty for entering administration.

The club were later relegated but competed in the 2010 FA Cup final losing to Chelsea. Despite being FA Cup finalists, the club were denied a licence to play European football the following season in the UEFA Europa League. On 17 August, Balram Chainrai completed his takeover of the club.

In October 2010, it was revealed just hours later that Portsmouth had finally come out of administration, with Balram Chainrai regaining control of the company. On 1 June 2011, Convers Sports Initiatives (CSI) owned by Russian Vladimir Antonov completed its takeover of the club, although an arrest warrant would later be issued for him in November 2011 following allegations of asset stripping. He shortly afterwards resigned as chairman of Portsmouth after parent company CSI entered administration. On 17 February 2012, Portsmouth went into administration for the second time in two years, bringing them an automatic 10-point deduction. They were relegated from the Championship in 2011–12, the first time in 30 years that the club had played in the third tier.

Following Pompey's relegation to League One, the entire professional playing squad left the club. The team were given a 10-point deduction in December 2012 for their financial issues. On 9 November 2012, Chanrai halted his attempt to buy the club. Six days later, the Pompey Supporters Trust signed a conditional agreement with PFK to buy the club. The club went on a record winless run of 23 matches during the season. On 10 April 2013, a deal with administrators was reached, although the Pompey Supporters' Trust had not yet finalised the purchase. Portsmouth were relegated again at the end of the season, to the fourth tier of English football for the first time in 33 years. On 19 April 2013, Portsmouth exited administration when the Pompey Supporters' Trust (PST) deal to buy the club was completed.

The 2013–14 season was also a turbulent one for Pompey with a high turnover of managers. With the club in serious danger of relegation to non-League, Andy Awford was again made caretaker manager and guided the club away from the drop. In a historic announcement on 29 September 2014, the club was able to declare itself debt-free after paying back all creditors and legacy payments to ex-players. Following an unsuccessful 2014–15 campaign, Paul Cook was appointed new manager of Portsmouth on 12 May 2015. Following an unsuccessful play-off attempt in the previous season, Paul Cook's side secured promotion to League One in 2016–17 with a 3–1 win away at Notts County and were later confirmed as champions. However, Paul Cook resigned on 31 May 2017 to join Wigan Athletic.

=== 2017–present ===
In May 2017, the Pompey Supporters' Trust (PST) voted in favour of a proposed bid by The Tornante Company, headed by former Disney chief executive Michael Eisner, to take over the club which was completed on 3 August 2017. Portsmouth finished their first season back in League One in 8th position. In the following season, they won the EFL Trophy, defeating Sunderland on penalties in the final, but lost to the same team in the play-offs.

Portsmouth were due to return to Wembley to defend the EFL Trophy against Salford City on 5 April 2020 in the final, but the COVID-19 pandemic forced the suspension of the season on 13 March. After the league was suspended, a points per game calculation meant that Pompey competed in the play-offs, albeit behind closed doors. Nevertheless, they lost on penalties to Oxford United.

The delayed 2020 EFL Trophy final was eventually played behind closed doors at Wembley Stadium in March 2021, with Portsmouth losing on penalties to Salford City. After three seasons finishing just below the play-off positions, they won promotion in the 2023–24 season as champions, ending their 12-year stay below the second tier.

In their first two seasons back in the Championship, Portsmouth finished 16th in 2024–25 and 18th in 2025–26, earning 55 points in the latter season.

== Club identity ==
=== Club badge ===
Flag of the City of Portsmouth

Although Portsmouth F.C. were formed in 1898, the club did not have a club badge until one was introduced for the 1913–14 season. The official coat of arms of the City of Portsmouth contains an eight pointed gold star and crescent moon on a blue shield.

The first 1913 Portsmouth F.C. badge was based on official symbols belonging to the town council of Portsmouth, which featured a golden eight-pointed star and a golden crescent moon. The club's first badge featured a horizontally elongated white crescent moon beneath a white five pointed star, with both symbols positioned in the centre of a blue four pointed shield. Portsmouth town council bestowed the privileged use (but not ownership) of their moon and star motifs to Portsmouth F.C., albeit with some colour and design changes.

Throughout their history Portsmouth F.C. have tried different variations of the badge. After World War II, Portsmouth began using an eight-pointed star to match that used by the city of Portsmouth. In the 1950s and 1960s, the traditional badge was emblazoned on the shirt in white rather than gold but this was due to white being a cheaper alternative to a more expensive gold coloured thread. Between 1980 and 1989, Portsmouth scrapped their traditional star and crescent badge and replaced it with an entirely new design. This badge showed a football in front of an anchor (representing the Royal Navy) and a sword (representing the British Army), with the whole design surrounded by an outer ring of ships rope. An alternative version included a circular version of the traditional star and crescent badge in place of the football.

During 1989 and 1993, the sword and anchor badge was dropped replaced with a simpler eight pointed star and crescent moon on a long narrow shield. From 1993 until 1997, the 1989–1993 long narrow shield design was replaced by an embroidered badge of the city of Portsmouth coat of arms. The 1993–1997 city arms badge was replaced in 1997 with an eight pointed gold star and a golden crescent moon on a blue shield edged with a gold outer rim. This new badge coincided with the centennial anniversary in the 1997–98 season.

On 6 May 2008, Portsmouth revealed a new badge with "three points" at the top of the shield were replaced with two straightened angles, with "Portsmouth F.C." written above the star on the shield. The traditional elongated crescent moon was replaced with a new circular one, which closely resembled that on the city's coat of arms. The new badge had its debut in the 2008 Community Shield match against Manchester United, in which Portsmouth also wore a new 110th Anniversary all-blue commemorative home strip. As part of the World War I Centennial Commemorations in the 2014–15 season, the club opted to temporarily replace the badge with a more traditional badge. In June 2015, Portsmouth reverted the official club badge back to a traditional design.

On 4 May 2017, during a meeting between the Tornante Company and the Supporters Trust, the prospective new owners identified a long overlooked ownership and copyright issue concerning the traditional Portsmouth badge – Portsmouth Football Club did not legally "own" the symbols on the badge, which had actually only been "on loan" to the club from Portsmouth City Council since 1913. On 15 March 2018, two newly redesigned club badges were finally revealed ahead of the 2018–19 season (one for players' shirts and the other for commercial purposes).

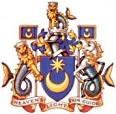
1992-1997

2015–2018

2018–present, shirt badge

2018–Present club and merchandising badge

=== Home colours ===
In the 1899–1900 season, Portsmouth's first home colours were salmon pink shirts with maroon collars and cuffs, matched with white shorts and black socks. The pink shirts gave the early Portsmouth F.C. the alternative second nickname of 'The Shrimps'. The collars and cuffs were the same colour as the Corporation of Portsmouth's public trams, which were painted maroon at the time. These colours lasted until the end of the 1908–09 season. At the start of the 1909–10 season, Portsmouth changed to white shirts with navy blue shorts and navy blue socks.

For the start of the 1912–13 Southern League Division One season, Portsmouth changed their home colours to azure blue shirts, white shorts and black socks. This was to become Portsmouth's home kit colour combination up until the start of the 1933–34 season, when the shirts were changed to a royal blue. These colours remained until the start of the 1947–48 season, when the black socks were changed to red; this coinciding with the club's most successful period and has remained the favoured colours for the majority of the time since. Portsmouth F.C. changed their colour combination several times during the 1966–1976 period, before reverting to the now tradition post-war blue shirts, white shorts and red stockings in 1976. For the club's 110th anniversary season in 2008–09, Portsmouth played in an all blue home kit, which debuted in the previous season's successful 2008 FA Cup final win. Since the 2009–10 season, Portsmouth reverted to the now traditional blue-white-red home kit.

==== Red socks memorial ====
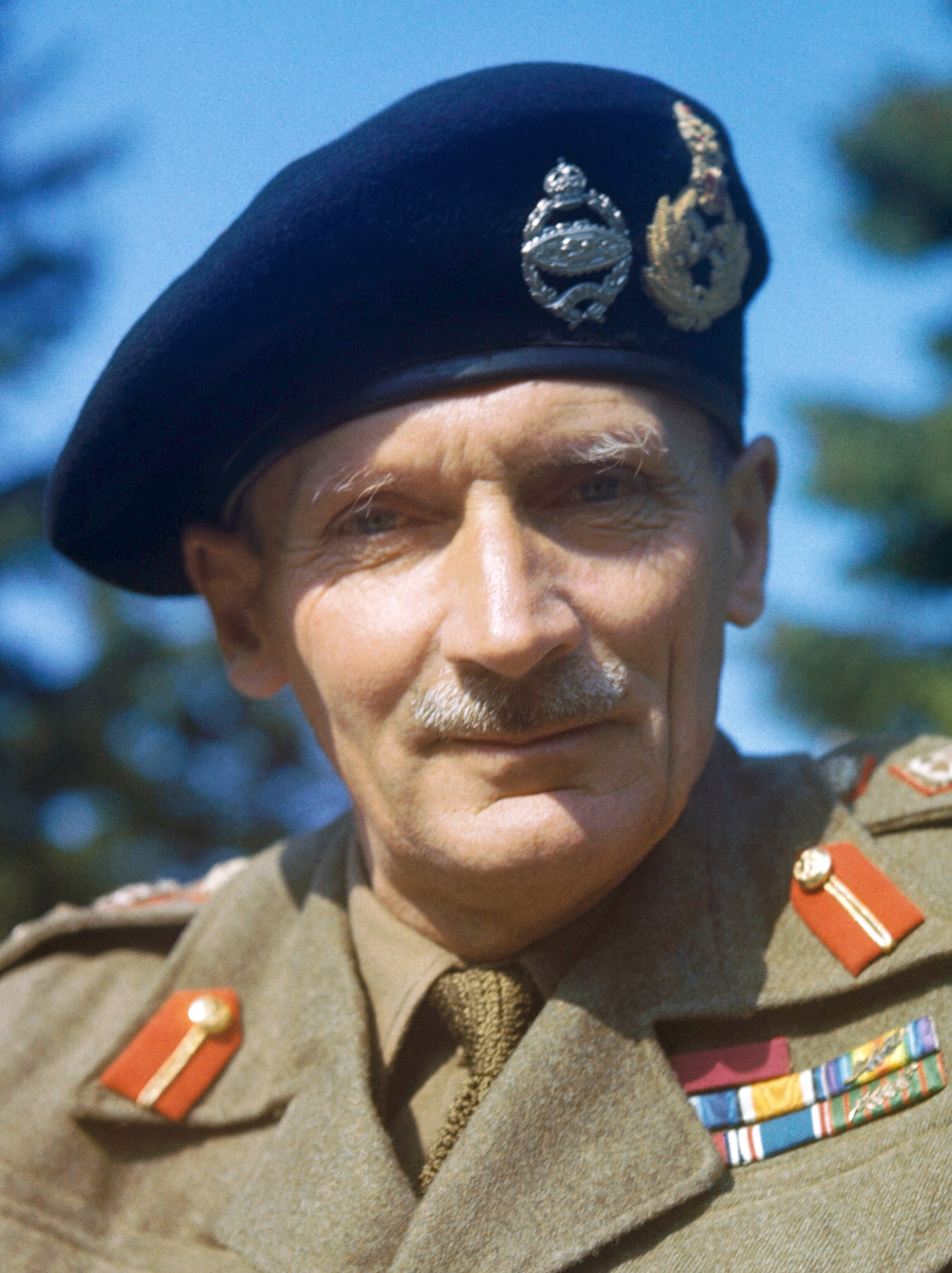
Sir Bernard 'Monty' Montgomery

Portsmouth had predominantly worn black socks since their first match in 1899. During the Second World War and post-war periods, the British Army's Field Marshal Sir Bernard 'Monty' Montgomery had been based at Southwick House, 5 miles to the north of Portsmouth. Montgomery regularly attended Pompey matches at Fratton Park, becoming the honorary President of Portsmouth Football Club. Following the suggestion by Montgomery, red socks were introduced by the club as a memorial to soldiers lost in wartime as red is the traditional colour of the British Army and also the colour of the Remembrance poppy. This also gave the Portsmouth team a patriotic blue, white and red appearance similar to the United Kingdom's red white and blue Union Flag. The new red socks also coincided with Portsmouth's most successful period, so the red socks were retained for good luck.

=== Away colours ===
The most frequent away colours used by Portsmouth have been white shirts with royal or navy blue shorts and either blue or white socks.

=== Other historic kits ===
For the 2008 FA Cup final victory against Cardiff City, Portsmouth debuted an all blue home kit manufactured by Canterbury and sponsored by Oki Printing Solutions to commemorate the club's 110th Anniversary year. The all blue home kit was also used throughout the following 2008–09 season.

Portsmouth again reached the FA Cup final in 2010, but were defeated 1–0 by Chelsea. Portsmouth, as the away team, wore a white and maroon kit inspired from elements of the original "Shrimps" era (1899–1909) kit in which maroon collars and cuffs featured on the salmon pink home shirts.

=== Kit manufacturers and sponsors ===
Years	Manufacturers	Shirt sponsors
1976–1977	Umbro	No sponsors
1978–1980	Admiral	No sponsors
1980–1983	Gola	No sponsors
1983–1984	Le Coq Sportif	No sponsors
1985–1987	Umbro	No sponsors
1987–1989	Admiral	South Coast Fiat (First seen in December 1987)
1989–1991	Scoreline	Goodmans
1991–1993	Influence	Goodmans
1993–1995	ASICS	Goodmans
1995–1997	ASICS	The News
1997–1999	Admiral	KJC Mobile Phones
1999–2000	Pompey Sport ^{1}	The Pompey Centre
2000–2002	Pompey Sport ^{1}	Bishop's Printers
2002–2005	Pompey Sport ^{1}	TY Europe
2005–2007	Jako	OKI
2007–2009	Canterbury	OKI
2009–2010	Canterbury	Jobsite.co.uk
2010–2013	Kappa	Jobsite.co.uk
2013–2018	Sondico	Jobsite.co.uk
2018–present	Nike	University of Portsmouth

^{1} Portsmouth's own manufacturer.

=== "Pompey" nickname ===
The traditional nickname of the Portsmouth Football Club is Pompey, a nickname already long associated with the English city of Portsmouth and its Royal Navy base. An exact origin for the Pompey nickname has never formally been identified by historians, as many variations and interpretations of the Pompey nickname exist.

== Ground ==
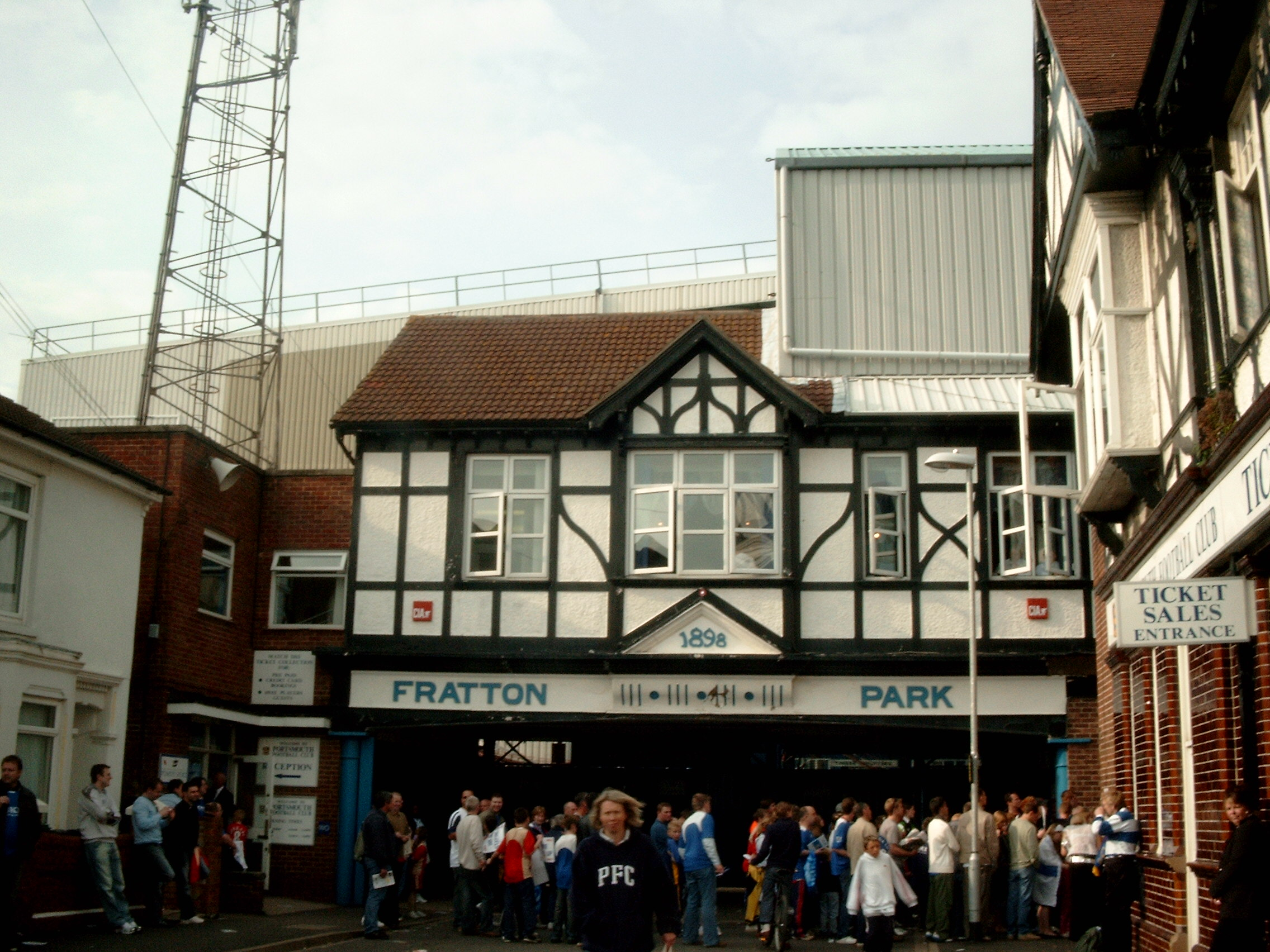
The entrance to Fratton Park's South Stand, with its mock Tudor facade

Portsmouth play their home games at Fratton Park, in the Portsmouth suburb of Milton. The football ground has been home to the club throughout its entire history. The football ground was formerly the site of a potato field in 1898 when it was purchased by the newly-formed Portsmouth Football & Athletic Company.

Fratton Park was designed and completed during 1899 by Portsmouth director and architect Alfred Bone and was first opened to the public on 15 August 1899. The early Fratton Park of 1899 only had one roofed all-seat stand on the pitch's southern side. The first ever football match to take place at Fratton Park was a friendly against Southampton, played on 6 September 1899, with Portsmouth winning 2–0. The first competitive match at Fratton Park was played three days later on 9 September 1899; a Southern League Division One match against Reading, which Portsmouth also won 2–0.

In 1905, the club expanded Fratton Park, adding a mock Tudor style club pavilion to the south-west corner in Frogmore Road, a pavilion designed by Alfred Bone. The pavilion originally featured a tall octagonal clock tower spire on its north-east corner, with an upper viewing gallery built beneath it giving an unobscured view over the entire Fratton Park pitch. In addition, two new solid earthbank terraces, topped with cinders and wooden planking were built behind the two goal ends. They were initially known as the Fratton Railway End and Milton End (or Spion Kop) and were built behind the west and east end goal lines respectively.

The pavilion's clock tower was demolished in the 1920s as the South Stand was partially built into the pavilion's footprint and still contains most of the pavilion's original east side within it. Ten years later in 1935, Archibald Leitch also designed a larger North Stand for Fratton Park. Fratton Park reached its current all-time ground attendance record of 51,385 supporters on 26 February 1949, for an FA Cup sixth-round match, a 2–1 win against Derby County. The Fratton Railway End was demolished in 1956 and replaced by a new prefabricated concrete and steel stand, simply known as The Fratton End. Fratton Park became an all seated football ground in 1996, which greatly reduced Fratton Park's previous maximum capacity. In 1997, a new Fratton End was opened in October 1997. Plans for relocation were first mooted in the early 1990s, but due to various objections and financial obstacles, the club has continued to play at Fratton Park.

== Training ground ==
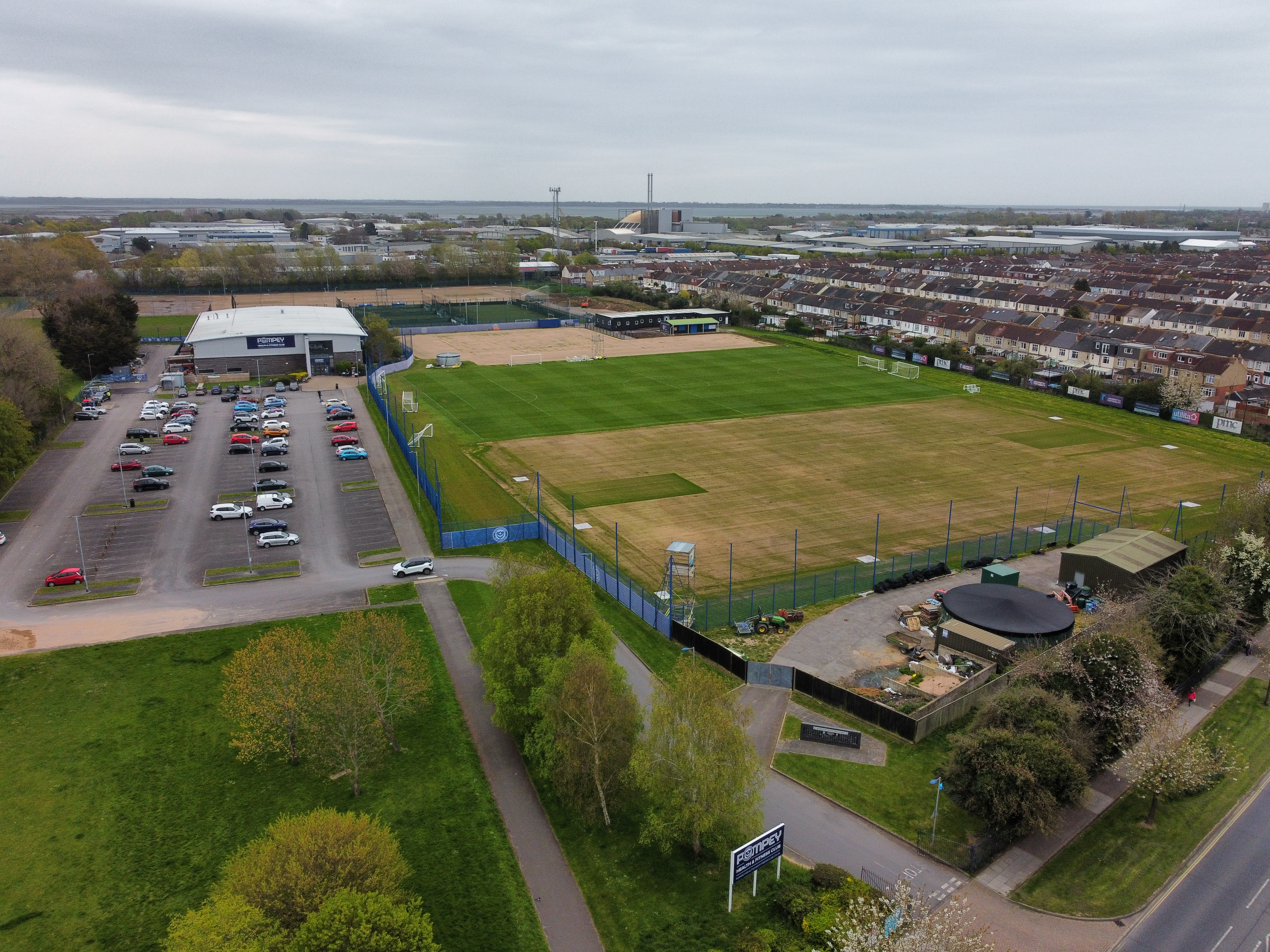
Portsmouth's training ground in Hilsea, Portsmouth

Portsmouth F.C. have been using their training ground at 442 Copnor Road (PO3 5EW) in the Hilsea area of Portsea Island since 2014. The facilities in Hilsea were formerly a ROKO health club until Portsmouth F.C. purchased them on 16 June 2021. The main ex-ROKO health club building has since been refurbished into 'Pompey Health And Fitness' members club, whose facilities are also used by Portsmouth F.C.'s squad.

== Rivalries and supporters ==
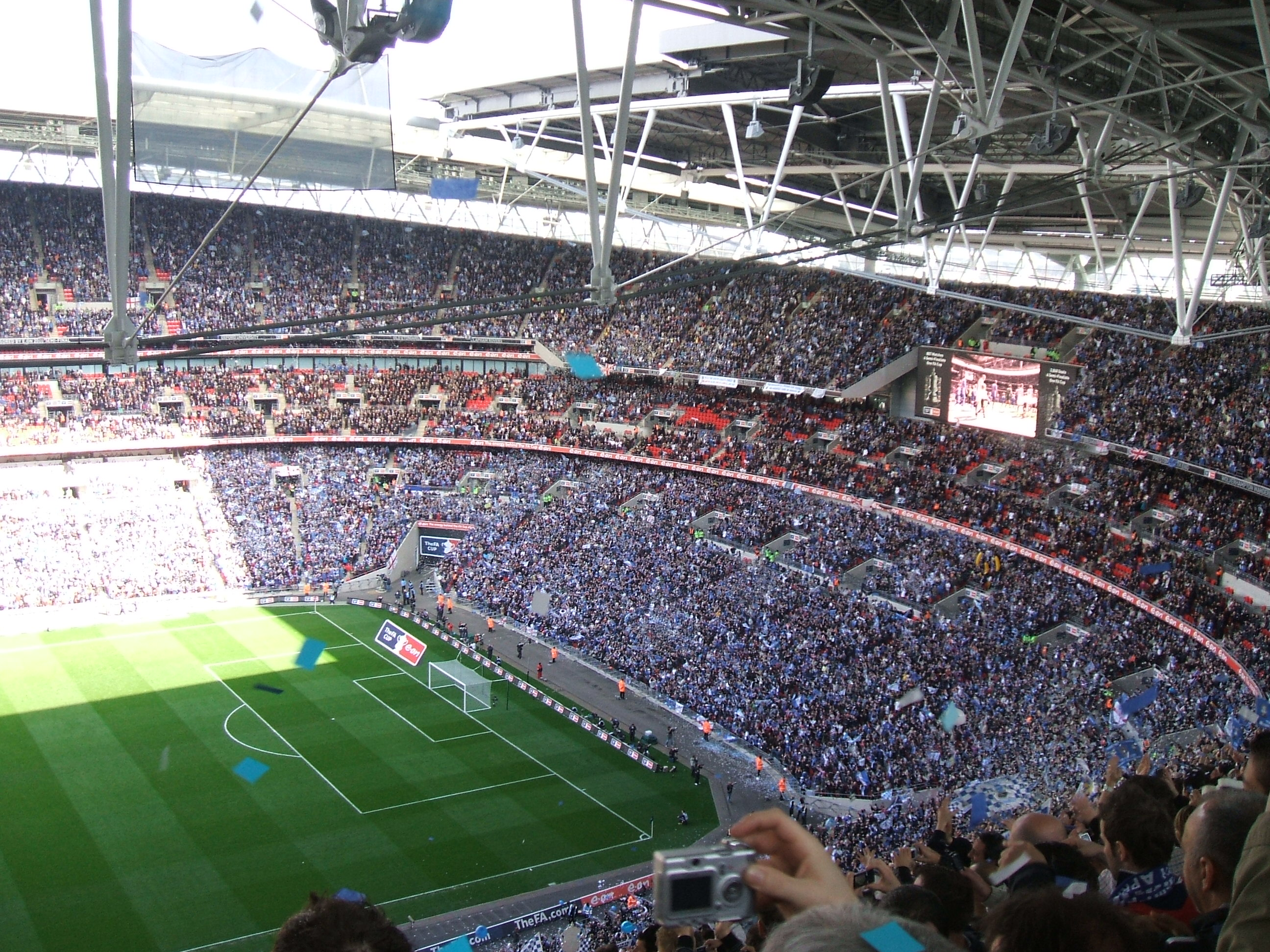
Portsmouth fans at Wembley Stadium for the 2007–08 FA Cup semi-final with West Bromwich Albion

Portsmouth's main rivals are Southampton, who are 19.8 miles (31.8 km) away. The South Coast Derby is one of the less frequently played rivalries within English football due to the clubs having usually been in different divisions; however this usually adds to the ferocity of the fixture.

Prior to the mid-late 1960s, rivalry between Portsmouth and Southampton was largely non-existent, as a consequence of their disparity in league status. This derby match has been sporadic. Since 1977, the teams have only been in the same division in five seasons: 1987–88, 2003–04, 2004–05, 2011–12, and 2025–26. As of June 2024, the two clubs have met 72 times in all competitions with Pompey winning on 21 occasions, Southampton winning 35 times and with 16 matches finishing level. The clubs most recently met on 11 October 2026, when Southampton defeated Portsmouth 1–0 at St Mary's Stadium.

Many Portsmouth supporters commonly use the derogatory nickname Scummer (plural: Scummers) to describe Southampton fans, or collectively Scum to also include their football club, and indeed the city of Southampton itself. According to the Oxford English Dictionary, Scummers was a derogatory name with naval origins for pirates or buccaneers, and was first recorded in use in 1585.

Meanwhile, Portsmouth supporters have had the equally derogatory nickname Skate bestowed upon them by Southampton fans as a rebuttal to Scummer since the 1987–88 Division One season. This was unofficially chosen by Southampton fans from a list of insults compiled by a Southampton-based supporters fanzine called The Ugly Inside in 1988. Ironically, the chosen nickname Skate was actually stolen from the civilian population of Portsmouth, who had long used Skate as a derogatory insult or nickname for sailors based in Portsmouth Dockyard and other Royal Navy establishments.

Another rivalry over the years, known as the "Dockyard Derby" by the media, is with Plymouth Argyle. This rivalry is also known as the Battle of the Ports. In recent seasons the club has also developed a minor rivalry with Sunderland, mainly stemming from the clubs meeting each other 5 times in the 2018–19 season.

=== 'The Pompey Chimes' ===
The best-known chant sung by Portsmouth supporters is "The Pompey Chimes". The chant is regarded as one of the oldest football chants still in use today.

"The Pompey Chimes" were originally called "The Town Hall Chimes", and were created by the supporters of Royal Artillery (Portsmouth) Football Club, a British Army artillery regiment team, who were the most popular and successful amateur football team based in Portsmouth for much of the 1890s. Royal Artillery played their home matches at the United Services Recreation Ground in Burnaby Road, Portsmouth, and were already nicknamed "Pompey" before the founding of Portsmouth F.C. in 1898.

The nearby Portsmouth Town Hall, only 0.3 miles (0.48 km) from Burnaby Road, was completed in 1890, and would strike the various Westminster Quarters chimes every quarter hour. Football referees would use the Town Hall's clock bells as a reference for when the football match should end at 4 pm. Just before 4 pm, supporters would sing in unison with the Town Hall's chimes on the hour to encourage the referee to blow the whistle to signify full-time. The original words to "The Pompey Chimes" (as printed in the 1900–01 Official Handbook of Portsmouth F.C.), were:

Play up Pompey,
Just one more goal!
Make tracks! What ho!
Hallo! Hallo!!

With the demise of Royal Artillery (Portsmouth) F.C. after their expulsion from the 1898–99 FA Amateur Cup for alleged professionalism, many of Royal Artillery's supporters switched their allegiance in 1899 to Portsmouth F.C., taking the "Town Hall Chimes" chant and the "Pompey" nickname from Burnaby Road to Fratton Park, a distance of 1.8 miles (2.8 km).

The Pompey Chimes are still sung at Fratton Park today, and have evolved to be sung at a quicker tempo, although with a shortened chime style – usually twice:

Play up Pompey,
Pompey play up!
Play up Pompey,
Pompey play up!

It is most common to hear The Chimes sung by Portsmouth supporters as an encouragement to the Portsmouth team, more specifically before the Portsmouth players take set-piece kicks.

== Club records ==
- Home attendance record: 51,385 vs. Derby County, 1948–49, FA Cup fifth round, 26 February 1949, Fratton Park
- Attendance record (neutral venue): 99,370 vs. Wolverhampton Wanderers, 1939 FA Cup final, 29 April 1939, Wembley Stadium
- Current Wembley Stadium attendance record for a football match: 89,874, 2008 FA Cup final, 17 May 2008
- Record victory: 9–1 vs. Notts County, Second Division, 9 April 1927
- Record defeat: 10–0 vs. Leicester City, First Division, 20 October 1928
- Highest scoring game: 7–4 (11 goals) vs. Reading, Premier League, 29 September 2007
- Most consecutive wins (all competitions): 9 (4 January 2020 – 8 February 2020)
- Most appearances for club: 845, Jimmy Dickinson, 1946–1965
- Most league goals for club: 194, Peter Harris, 1946–1960
- Most league goals in a season: 42, Guy Whittingham, 1992–93
- Most goals for club: 208, Peter Harris, 1946–1960
- Most international caps while at club: 48, Jimmy Dickinson (England)
- Transfer record (received): £20 million from Real Madrid for Lassana Diarra, December 2008
- Transfer record (paid): £11 million to Liverpool for Peter Crouch, July 2008

=== Portsmouth in Europe ===
To date Portsmouth have played one season in UEFA competitions, competing in the 2008–09 UEFA Cup. They beat Vitória de Guimarães 4–2 on aggregate in the first round. In the group stage Portsmouth registered one win along with a draw against A.C. Milan, and were knocked out at the group stages after a 3–2 away loss to VfL Wolfsburg.

Season	Competition	Round	Opponents	Home	Away	Aggregate
2008–09	UEFA Cup	R1	(Portugal) Vitória de Guimarães	2–0	2–2	4–2
2008–09	UEFA Cup	Group E	(Portugal) Braga	–	3–0	–
2008–09	UEFA Cup	Group E	(Italy) AC Milan	2–2	–	–
2008–09	UEFA Cup	Group E	(Germany) Wolfsburg	–	3–2	–
2008–09	UEFA Cup	Group E	(Netherlands) Heerenveen	3–0	–	–

== Players ==
For a list of notable players and players who played for Portsmouth for more than 100 games in a sortable-list format, see List of Portsmouth F.C. players.

=== Squad ===
As of 3 September 2026

Note: Flags indicate national team as defined under FIFA eligibility rules; some limited exceptions apply. Players may hold more than one non-FIFA nationality.

No.	Pos.	Nation	Player
1	GK	AUT	Nicolas Schmid
2	DF	ENG	Benjamin Arthur (on loan from Brentford)
3	DF	ENG	Connor Ogilvie
5	DF	WAL	Regan Poole
6	DF	IRL	Conor Shaughnessy
7	MF	ENG	Marlon Pack (captain)
8	MF	ENG	John Swift
9	FW	ENG	Colby Bishop
10	FW	CRO	Adrian Segečić
11	FW	ENG	Abu Kamara
15	FW	IRL	Franco Umeh
16	DF	ENG	Jayden Meghoma (on loan from Brentford)
17	FW	SKN	Tyrese Shade
18	MF	HUN	Márk Kosznovszky
19	MF	EST	Rocco Shein

No.	Pos.	Nation	Player
20	FW	AUS	Thomas Waddingham
21	FW	ENG	Keshi Anderson
22	DF	ENG	Zak Swanson
23	FW	ENG	Josh Murphy
24	DF	NIR	Terry Devlin
25	FW	ENG	Ryan Kavuma-McQueen (on loan from Chelsea)
27	MF	ENG	Odin Bailey
28	FW	NZL	Luke Brooke-Smith
29	FW	SRB	Marezi
30	GK	ENG	Ben Killip
31	GK	POL	Daniel Bielica
32	FW	NIR	Eoin Kenny
34	FW	ENG	Harvey Blair
37	MF	COM	Iyad Mohamed
38	MF	GAM	Ebou Adams
55	DF	SEN	Madiodio Dia

=== Out on loan ===
Note: Flags indicate national team as defined under FIFA eligibility rules; some limited exceptions apply. Players may hold more than one non-FIFA nationality.

No.	Pos.	Nation	Player
33	DF	AUS	Jacob Farrell (at Sydney FC)
45	MF	ENG	Chinedu Agu (at Basingstoke Town)
46	FW	ENG	Tayo Singerr (at AFC Totton)
48	FW	ENG	Nathaniel Chioma (at Poole Town)
49	DF	ENG	Michael Ani (at Havant & Waterlooville)
—	GK	ENG	Josef Bursik (at AFC Wimbledon)

No.	Pos.	Nation	Player
—	GK	ENG	Toby Steward (at St Johnstone)
—	DF	ENG	Josh Knight (at Reading)
—	DF	AUS	Hayden Matthews (at Bradford City)
—	DF	ENG	Jordan Williams (at Blackpool)
—	FW	NIR	Makenzie Kirk (at Barnsley)

=== Retired and reserved numbers ===
- Number 1 was temporarily retired for the 2001–02 season in respect to goalkeeper Aaron Flahavan, who died in a car crash in August 2001, days after being handed the squad number 1 for the first time. Since the 2003–04 season, number 13 shirt was reserved in respect for him, as this was the number he wore for the majority of his stay at the club. Ten years after his death, however, the number 13 was again used.
- Number 12 is the number reserved for the Portsmouth fans, regarding the fans as the twelfth player.
- Number 58 is "Nelson", the club mascot's number.

=== Portsmouth Player of the Season (since 1968) ===
Name of the player and number of times they won this award (if more than one).

- 1968 – (England) Ray Pointer
- 1969 – (England) John Milkins
- 1970 – (England) Nicky Jennings
- 1971 – (England) David Munks
- 1972 – (England) Richie Reynolds
- 1973 – N/A
- 1974 – (England) Paul Went
- 1975 – (England) Mick Mellows
- 1976 – (England) Paul Cahill
- 1977 – N/A
- 1978 – N/A
- 1979 – (England) Peter Mellor
- 1980 – (England) Joe Laidlaw
- 1981 – N/A
- 1982 – (England) Alan Knight
- 1983 – (England) Alan Biley
- 1984 – (England) Mark Hateley
- 1985 – (England) Neil Webb
- 1986 – (Jamaica) Noel Blake
- 1987 – (Jamaica) Noel Blake (2)
- 1988 – (Wales) Barry Horne
- 1989 – (England) Micky Quinn
- 1990 – (England) Guy Whittingham
- 1991 – (England) Martin Kuhl
- 1992 – (England) Darren Anderton
- 1993 – (England) Paul Walsh
- 1994 – (Wales) Kit Symons
- 1995 – (England) Alan Knight (2)
- 1996 – (England) Alan Knight (3)
- 1997 – (England) Lee Bradbury
- 1998 – (England) Andy Awford
- 1999 – (England) Steve Claridge
- 2000 – (England) Steve Claridge (2)
- 2001 – (England) Scott Hiley
- 2002 – (England) Peter Crouch
- 2003 – (England) Linvoy Primus
- 2004 – (Netherlands) Arjan de Zeeuw
- 2005 – (Serbia and Montenegro) Dejan Stefanović
- 2006 – (England) Gary O'Neil
- 2007 – (England) David James
- 2008 – (England) David James (2)
- 2009 – (England) Glen Johnson
- 2010 – (England) Jamie O'Hara
- 2011 – (England) Hayden Mullins
- 2012 – (Portugal) Ricardo Rocha
- 2013 – (Austria) Johannes Ertl
- 2014 – (England) Ricky Holmes
- 2015 – (England) Jed Wallace
- 2016 – (Republic of Ireland) Michael Doyle
- 2017 – (Republic of Ireland) Enda Stevens
- 2018 – (England) Matt Clarke
- 2019 – (England) Matt Clarke (2)
- 2020 – (England) Christian Burgess
- 2021 – (Scotland) Craig MacGillivray
- 2022 – (England) Sean Raggett
- 2023 – (England) Colby Bishop
- 2024 – (England) Marlon Pack
- 2025 – (England) Josh Murphy
- 2026 – (Northern Ireland) Terry Devlin

=== Portsmouth Hall of Fame ===
Portsmouth created a Hall of Fame in March 2009, which honours former players and staff members of the club. At a year-by-year ceremony, the club holds a day to announce the year's inducted to the list, and also has a dinner for the people present.

The following players have been inducted into the Portsmouth Football Club Hall of Fame:

*Denotes player for Portsmouth FC Women

Inducted	Name	Nat.	Position or role	Playing career	Managerial career	Player Apps	Player Goals
2009	Jimmy Dickinson	(England)	LH	1946–65	1977–79	828	10
2009	Peter Harris	(England)	OF	1946–60	—	519	209
2009	Ray Hiron	(England)	FW	1964–75	—	366	117
2009	Alan Knight	(England)	GK	1978–2000/2003–04	—	801	0
2009	Guy Whittingham	(England)	ST	1992–94	2012–13	226	115
2010	Len Phillips	(England)	IF	1946–56	—	272	54
2010	John Milkins	(England)	GK	1961–74	—	389	0
2010	Mick Tait	(England)	FW	1980–87	—	280	31
2010	Andy Awford	(England)	CB	1989–2000	2014–15	371	3
2010	Duggie Reid	(Scotland)	IF	1946–56	—	327	135
2011	Jack Froggatt	(England)	LH	1946–54	—	305	72
2011	Johnny Gordon	(England)	IF	1949–58/1961–67	—	491	118
2011	Alan McLoughlin	(Republic of Ireland)	CM	1992–99	—	361	69
2011	Linvoy Primus	(England)	CB	2000–09	—	219	6
2011	Albert McCann	(England)	FW	1962-74	—	379	96
2011	Paul Walsh	(England)	ST	1992–94/1995–96	—	113	26
2012	Reg Flewin	(England)	CB	1937–53	—	172	0
2012	Norman Piper	(England)	LW	1970–78	—	356	57
2012	Alan Biley	(England)	FW	1982–84	—	120	57
2012	Steve Claridge	(England)	ST	1998/1998–2001	2000–01	124	37
2012	Micky Quinn	(England)	ST	1985–88	—	139	67
2013	Jack Weddle	(England)	FW	1927–38	—	396	187
2013	Jimmy Scoular	(Scotland)	WH	1945–53	—	268	8
2013	Ron Saunders	(England)	ST	1958–64	—	258	156
2013	Eoin Hand	(Republic of Ireland)	U	1968–76/1977–79	—	307	14
2013	Kit Symons	(Wales)	DF	1988–95	—	205	11
2014	Ernie Butler	(England)	GK	1946–53	—	241	0
2014	Arjan de Zeeuw	(Netherlands)	CB	2002–05	—	118	5
2014	Billy Gilbert	(England)	CB	1984–89	—	164	0
2014	Harry Harris	(Wales)	WH/IF	1958–70	—	428	49
2014	Nicky Jennings	(England)	LW	1967–74	—	227	51
2015	Ike Clarke	(England)	ST	1947–53	—	130	59
2015	David James	(England)	GK	2006–10	—	158	0
2015	Kevin Dillon	(England)	CM	1983–89	—	257	59
2015	George Ley	(England)	LB/LW	1967–72	—	204	11
2015	Billy Wilson	(England)	FB	1972–79	—	217	6
2015	Arthur Egerton Knight	(England)	LB	1908–22	—	214	1
2016	Svetoslav Todorov	(Bulgaria)	ST	2001–07	—	83	33
2016	Noel Blake	(Jamaica)	CB	1984–88	—	173	14
2016	Dave Kemp	(England)	ST	1976–78	—	74	48
2016	Billy Haines	(England)	FW	1922–28	—	179	129
2017	Paul Merson	(England)	MF	2002–03	—	48	12
2017	Colin Garwood	(England)	ST	1978–80	—	78	34
2017	Cliff Parker	(England)	OL	1933–51	—	256	64
2017	Vince Hilaire	(England)	MF	1984–88	—	174	27
2018	Alex Wilson	(Scotland)	FB	1949–67	—	382	5
2018	Alan Rogers	(England)	FW	1979–84	—	190	17
2018	Gemma Hillier*	(England)	FW	2001-17	—	282	92
2018	Mark Hateley	(England)	ST	1983–84	—	44	25
2018	Mick Kennedy	(Republic of Ireland)	CM	1984–87	—	149	5
2024	Bob Blyth	(Scotland)	DF	1899-1901	1901-04	151	6
2024	Hermann Hreiðarsson	(Iceland)	DF	2007-12	—	123	8
2025	Bert Barlow	(England)	FW	1938-49	—	114	34
2025	Matt Taylor	(England)	MF	2002-08	—	204	29

=== Women's team ===
The club's female counterpart is Portsmouth Women, which was founded in 1987. The team currently competes in the Women's National League South and since the start of the 2026-2027 season, play at Fratton Park. Following the takeover of the club by the Portsmouth Supporters Trust, it was announced that there would be closer ties between the men's and women's clubs.

On 5 June 2023, Portsmouth announced that their women's team would integrate under The Tornate Company, meaning the side would be turning semi-professional for the first time in the club's history.

== Club management ==
=== Club staff ===
Position	Staff
Chairman	(United States) Michael Eisner
Directors board	(United States) Michael Eisner (United States) Eric Eisner (United States) Breck Eisner (United States) Anders Eisner (England) Mark Catlin
CEO	(England) Andrew Cullen
CCO	(England) Mark Judges
Sporting director	(England) Richard Hughes
Head coach	(England) John Mousinho
Assistant head coach	(England) Jon Harley
First team coach	(Republic of Ireland) Michael Doyle
First team development coach	(Wales) Joe Morrell
Goalkeeping coach	(England) Joe Prodomo
Performance Manager	(Wales) Ian Leman
Fitness coach	(England) Max Whittingham (Republic of Ireland) George Bell
Analyst	(England) Dan Ashby (England) Eddie Denton (England) Jared Guzenda
Head of Medical	(England) Steve Hard
Club doctor	(England) Chris Bosshardt
Physio	(England) Rupak Pun (England) Matt Best
Head of recruitment	(England) Brad Wall
Scout	(England) Kieran Evans (England) Daaryl Finney (England) Joel Byrom (England) Haydn Thomas
Mascots	Nelson & Pompey Sailor

=== Ownership ===
Portsmouth Football Club has operated under five different parent company names in its history:

- Portsmouth Football and Athletic Company Limited (5 April 1898 – 27 July 1912)
- Portsmouth Football Club Limited (27 July 1912 – 12 May 1999) (initially as 'Portsmouth Football Company Limited' from 27 July 1912 until 23 January 1989 when name officially changed to 'Portsmouth Football Club Limited')
- Portsmouth City Football Club Limited (12 May 1999 – 25 May 2010) (initially as 'Overflint Limited' from 7 April 1999 – 12 May 1999)
- Portsmouth Football Club (2010) Limited (25 May 2010 – 10 April 2013) (initially as 'PFC Realisations Limited' from 25 May 2010 – 23 November 2010)
- Portsmouth Community Football Club Limited (10 April 2013 – present) (initially as 'Portsmouth Supporters Trust (Operations) Limited' from 7 February 2012 – 14 September 2012)

The current owner of Portsmouth Community Football Club Limited is The Tornante Company, which purchased the club from the Portsmouth Supporters Trust (PST) on 3 August 2017.

== Affiliated clubs ==
Portsmouth have had a long-standing relationship with Havant & Waterlooville, with regular pre-season friendlies organised between the two clubs. Portsmouth have also previously used West Leigh Park, Havant & Waterlooville's home stadium, for reserve team matches. Previous links with Belgian side Zulte Waregem and Irish academy Home Farm have been cancelled.

Portsmouth have developed a relationship with Gosport Borough after their promotion to the Conference South. Portsmouth fans were encouraged to support Gosport in their FA Trophy final match at Wembley in March 2014. They also play friendlies and loan out players to the side.

== Honours ==
Portsmouth are one of only five English football clubs to have been champions of all four tiers of the professional English football pyramid.

League

- First Division (level 1)
  - Champions: 1948–49, 1949–50
- Second Division / First Division (level 2)
  - Champions: 2002–03
  - Runners-up: 1926–27, 1986–87
- Third Division South / Third Division / League One (level 3)
  - Champions: 1923–24, 1961–62, 1982–83, 2023–24
- Fourth Division / League Two (level 4)
  - Champions: 2016–17
  - Promoted: 1979–80
- Southern League First Division
  - Champions: 1901–02, 1919–20
- Western League First Division
  - Champions: 1900–01, 1901–02, 1902–03

Cup

- FA Cup
  - Winners: 1938–39, 2007–08
  - Runners-up: 1928–29, 1933–34, 2009–10
- FA Charity Shield / Community Shield
  - Winners: 1949 (shared)
  - Runners-up: 2008
- EFL Trophy
  - Winners: 2018–19
  - Runners-up: 2019–20
- Hampshire Senior Cup
  - Winners: 1902–03, 1912–13, 1951–52, 1986–87

== Citations ==
=== General references ===
- Farmery, Colin (1999). Portsmouth: From Tindall to Ball – A Complete Record. Desert Island Books. ISBN 1-874287-25-2.
- Farmery, Colin (2004). Seventeen Miles From Paradise – Saints v Pompey: Passion, Pride and Prejudice. Desert Island Books. ISBN 1-874287-89-9.
- Farmery, Colin (2005). Portsmouth: the Modern Era – a Complete Record. Desert Island Books. ISBN 1-905328-08-7.
- Inglis, Simon (1996). Football Grounds of Britain. Collins Willow. ISBN 0-00-218426-5.
- Pennant, Cass; Silvester, Rob (2004). Rolling with the 6.57 Crew – The True Story of Pompey's Legendary Football Fans. John Blake Publishing. ISBN 1-84454-072-3.
