= Shankly (surname) =

Shankly is a surname. Notable people with the surname include:

- Alec Shankly, Scottish footballer
- Bill Shankly (1913–1981), Scottish footballer and manager
- Bob Shankly (1910–1982), Scottish footballer and manager
- Jimmy Shankly (1901–1972), Scottish footballer
- John Shankly (1903–1960), Scottish footballer
