= Jimmy Nisbet =

Scottish footballer

Personal information
- Full name: James Nisbet
- Date of birth: 27 August 1904
- Place of birth: Glenbuck, Scotland
- Date of death: 18 November 1964 (aged 60)
- Place of death: Broxburn, Scotland
- Position: Right winger

Senior career*
Years	Team	Apps	(Gls)
- Glenbuck Athletic
- Cumnock Juniors
1926–1931	Ayr United	129	(29)
1931–1932	Dalbeattie Star		
Total		129	(29)

International career
1929	Scotland	3	(2)
- * Club domestic league appearances and goals

James Nisbet (27 August 1904 – 18 November 1964) was a Scottish footballer who played as a right winger.

Born in Glenbuck, Nisbet played club football for Glenbuck Athletic, Cumnock Juniors, Ayr United and Dalbeattie Star, and made three appearances for Scotland in 1929.
