= Alec Shankly =

Scottish footballer

Personal information
- Full name: Alexander Shankly
- Place of birth: Glenbuck, Scotland
- Positions: Inside left; left half

Senior career*
Years	Team	Apps	(Gls)
–1916	Glenbuck Cherrypickers		
1916–1920	Ayr United	29	(3)
1920–1922	Nithsdale Wanderers		
1922–	Portsmouth	0	(0)
–1923	Nithsdale Wanderers	2	(0)
- * Club domestic league appearances and goals

Alexander Shankly was a Scottish professional footballer who played in the Scottish League for Ayr United and Nithsdale Wanderers as an inside left.

== Personal life ==
Shankly's brothers Bill, Jimmy, John and Bob all became footballers. He served in the Royal Scots Fusiliers and in the Royal Flying Corps during the First World War. Shankly was troubled by sciatica after the war and returned to work as a miner before being forced into early retirement.

== Career statistics ==
Appearances and goals by club, season and competition
Club	Season	League			National Cup		Total	
Club	Season	Division	Apps	Goals	Apps	Goals	Apps	Goals
Ayr United	1916–17	Scottish Division One	18	2	—		18	2
Ayr United	1917–18	Scottish Division One	11	1	—		11	1
Ayr United	Total		29	3	—		29	3
Nithsdale Wanderers	1923–24	Scottish Division Three	2	0	0	0	2	0
Career total			31	3	0	0	31	3
