= John Shankly =

Scottish footballer

Personal information
- Full name: John Dunlop Shankly
- Date of birth: 4 November 1903
- Place of birth: Glenbuck, Scotland
- Date of death: 18 May 1960 (aged 56)
- Place of death: Glasgow, Scotland
- Positions: Inside right; outside right

Senior career*
Years	Team	Apps	(Gls)
- Glenbuck Cherrypickers
–1922	Nithsdale Wanderers		
1922–1923	Portsmouth	3	(1)
1924–1925	Luton Town	46	(20)
1930	Alloa Athletic	13	(4)
1930–1931	Blackpool	5	(0)
1931–1933	Morton	45	(9)
1933–1934	King's Park	28	(4)
1934–1936	Alloa Athletic	35	(15)
- Dalbeattie Star
- * Club domestic league appearances and goals

John Dunlop Shankly (4 November 1903 – 18 May 1960) was a Scottish professional footballer who played as a forward in the Scottish League and the Football League.

== Personal life ==
Shankly's brothers Alec, Bill, Jimmy and Bob all became footballers. After retiring from football, he returned to work as a miner. Shankly died at Glasgow Victoria Infirmary on 18 May 1960, after suffering a heart attack during the 1960 European Cup Final earlier that evening.

== Career statistics ==
Appearances and goals by club, season and competition
Club	Season	League			National Cup		Total	
Club	Season	Division	Apps	Goals	Apps	Goals	Apps	Goals
Portsmouth	1922–23	Third Division South	2	0	0	0	2	0
Portsmouth	1923–24	Third Division South	1	0	0	0	1	0
Portsmouth	Total		3	0	0	0	3	0
Luton Town	1924–25	Third Division South	28	11	0	0	28	11
Luton Town	1925–26	Third Division South	18	9	2	1	20	10
Luton Town	Total		46	20	2	1	48	21
Alloa Athletic	1930–31	Scottish Division Two	13	4	0	0	13	4
Morton	1930–31	Scottish Division One	9	2	—		9	2
Morton	1931–32	Scottish Division One	21	4	0	0	21	4
Morton	1932–33	Scottish Division One	15	3	1	0	16	3
Morton	Total		45	9	1	0	46	9
King's Park	1933–34	Scottish Division Two	28	4	0	0	28	4
Alloa Athletic	1934–35	Scottish Division Two	7	1	0	0	7	1
Alloa Athletic	1935–36	Scottish Division Two	28	14	3	1	31	15
Alloa Athletic	Alloa Athletic total		48	19	3	1	51	20
Career total			124	32	4	1	128	33
