= Jimmy Shankly =

Scottish footballer

Personal information
- Full name: James Blyth Shankly
- Date of birth: 19 June 1901
- Place of birth: Glenbuck, Scotland
- Date of death: 1972 (aged 70–71)
- Height: 5 ft 11 in (1.80 m)
- Position: Centre forward

Senior career*
Years	Team	Apps	(Gls)
1921–1922	Glenbuck Cherrypickers		
1922	Bedlington United		
1922–1923	Portsmouth	0	(0)
1923–1924	Guildford United		
1924–1925	Halifax Town	7	(2)
1925–1926	Nuneaton Town	19	(26)
1926	Coventry City	9	(2)
1926	Carlisle United		
1926–1928	Sheffield United	7	(4)
1928–1933	Southend United	147	(97)
1933–1935	Barrow	78	(47)
1935–1936	Carlisle United	6	(3)
- * Club domestic league appearances and goals

James Blyth Shankly (19 June 1901 – 1972) was a Scottish professional footballer who is best remembered for his prolific goalscoring as a centre forward in the Football League for Southend United and Barrow. He also played English league football for Coventry City, Halifax Town, Sheffield United and Carlisle United.

== Personal life ==
Shankly's brothers Alec, Bill, John and Bob all became footballers. After retiring from football, he went into business as a coal merchant.

== Career statistics ==
Appearances and goals by club, season and competition
Club	Season	League			National Cup		Other		Total	
Club	Season	Division	Apps	Goals	Apps	Goals	Apps	Goals	Apps	Goals
Nuneaton Town	1925–26	Southern League Eastern Division	19	26	1	0	3 (Note: 2 appearances and 3 goals in Birmingham Senior Cup, 1 appearance and 1 goal in Nuneaton Charity Cup)	4	23	30
Coventry City	1925–26	Third Division North	9	2	—		1 (Note: Appearance in Coventry Nursing Cup)	1	10	3
Career total			28	28	1	0	4	5	10	3
