= Bob Blyth =

Scottish footballer and manager

Personal information
- Full name: Robert Fleming Blyth
- Date of birth: 16 October 1869
- Place of birth: Glenbuck, Ayrshire, Scotland
- Date of death: 7 February 1941 (aged 71)
- Place of death: Milton, Portsmouth, Hampshire, England
- Position: Wing half

Youth career
- Glenbuck Cherrypickers

Senior career*
Years	Team	Apps	(Gls)
- Middlesbrough Ironopolis
1891–1894	Rangers	10	(2)
1894–1899	Preston North End	114	(8)
1897	Dundee	9	(2)
1899–1901	Portsmouth		
Total		133	(12)

Managerial career
- 1901–1904: Portsmouth
- * Club domestic league appearances and goals

Robert Fleming Blyth (16 October 1869 – 7 February 1941) was a Scottish footballer and manager for Portsmouth from 1901 to 1904.

== Football career ==
Blyth was born in Glenbuck, and was a member of the Glenbuck Cherrypickers, playing alongside members of his extended family. From there he was scouted by the Rangers, playing as a wing-half (1891–1894), followed by Preston North End (1894–1899), a brief spell at Dundee (1897), and Portsmouth (1899–1901).

He became player–manager of Portsmouth in 1901, winning the 1901-02 Southern League title. After retiring from his post as manager, he later served Portsmouth as director and chairman. According to the Portsmouth Evening News, Blyth was "the only man to rise from professional player to be chairman of his club through all the intermediate positions: Captain, player-manager, manager, director, and vice-chairman."

== Personal life and family ==
Blyth grew up in a poor mining village which managed to produce a number of football stars. Five of his nephews played professionally, including future Liverpool manager Bill Shankly OBE and Bob Shankly, sons of his sister, Barbara. His brother William Blyth also played for Portsmouth.

He married Isabella Taylor, with whom he had daughters Mary and Janet, and a son, Robert Blyth, who played for both Portsmouth and Southampton in the 1920s.

Blyth was also a licensee and operated several hotels in Portsmouth. He died peacefully at St James' Hospital, Portsmouth, in 1941.

== Honours ==
=== As manager ===
Portsmouth

- Southern League championships: 1901-02
