= Alex McConnell =

Scottish footballer

Personal information
- Full name: Alexander McConnell
- Date of birth: 1875
- Place of birth: Glenbuck, Scotland
- Height: 5 ft 8 in (1.73 m)
- Position: Full-back

Senior career*
Years	Team	Apps	(Gls)
1896–1897	Glenbuck Athletic		
1897	Everton	0	(0)
1897–1899	Woolwich Arsenal	37	(1)
1899–1901	Queens Park Rangers	51	(0)
1901–1906	Grimsby Town	84	(0)
- * Club domestic league appearances and goals

Alexander McConnell (1875 – after 1905) was a Scottish professional footballer who played as a full-back.
