= Willie Muir =

Scottish footballer

Personal information
- Full name: William Muir
- Date of birth: 17 January 1876
- Place of birth: Coalburn, Scotland
- Date of death: 18 October 1941 (aged 65)
- Place of death: Dunoon, Scotland
- Height: 5 ft 10 in (1.78 m)
- Position: Goalkeeper

Senior career*
| Years | Team | Apps | (Gls) |
- Glenbuck Athletic
| 1896 | Third Lanark (trial) | 3 | (0) |
| 1897 | Kilmarnock | 12 | (0) |
| 1897–1902 | Everton | 127 | (0) |
| 1902–1907 | Dundee | 131 | (0) |
| 1907–1908 | Bradford City | 28 | (0) |
| 1908–1911 | Heart of Midlothian | 59 | (0) |
| 1910–1911 | → Dundee Hibernian (loan) | | |
| 1911–1912 | Dumbarton | 5 | (0) |
| Total | | 365 | (0) |

International career
| 1903–1907 | Scottish League XI | 2 | (0) |
| 1907 | Scotland | 1 | (0) |
- * Club domestic league appearances and goals

William Muir (17 January 1876 – 18 October 1941) was a Scottish footballer who played as a goalkeeper for Third Lanark, Kilmarnock, Everton, Dundee, Bradford City, Heart of Midlothian, Dundee Hibernian, Dumbarton and Scotland.
