= Bill Shankly =

Scottish footballer and manager (1913–1981)

Bill Shankly OBE

Personal information
- Full name: William Shankly
- Date of birth: 2 September 1913
- Place of birth: Glenbuck, Ayrshire, Scotland
- Date of death: 29 September 1981 (aged 68)
- Place of death: Liverpool, Merseyside, England
- Height: 5 ft 7 in (1.70 m)
- Position: Right-half (Note: The position of wing half is now obsolete in football terminology but it was an important role at the time of Shankly's career when teams routinely played in a 2–3–5 formation. The wing halves (right and left) played outside the centre-half in the middle three. Although some wing halves were more creative than defensive, Shankly's job was to win the ball (hence his emphasis on his tackling skills) and move it forward, so he was the equivalent of what is called a holding midfielder in 21st century football.)

Youth career
- 1931–1932: Cronberry Eglinton

Senior career*
Years	Team	Apps	(Gls)
1932–1933	Carlisle United	16	(0)
1933–1949	Preston North End	297	(13)
Total		313	(13)

International career
1938–1939	Scotland	5	(0)

Managerial career
- 1949–1951: Carlisle United
- 1951–1954: Grimsby Town
- 1954–1955: Workington
- 1956–1959: Huddersfield Town
- 1959–1974: Liverpool
- * Club domestic league appearances and goals

William Shankly (2 September 1913 – 29 September 1981) was a Scottish football player and manager who is best known for his time as manager of Liverpool. Shankly brought success to Liverpool, gaining promotion to the First Division and winning three League Championships and the UEFA Cup. He laid foundations on which his successors Bob Paisley and Joe Fagan were able to build by winning seven league titles and four European Cups in the ten seasons after Shankly retired in 1974. A charismatic, iconic figure at the club, his oratory stirred the emotions of the fanbase. Ronnie Moran, who was the captain of Liverpool when Shankly arrived in 1959, said "he was the one that resurrected the club."

Shankly came from a small Scottish mining community and was one of five brothers who played football professionally. He played as a ball-winning right-half and was capped twelve times for Scotland, including seven wartime internationals. He spent one season at Carlisle United before spending the rest of his career at Preston North End, with whom he won the FA Cup in 1938. His playing career was interrupted by his service in the Royal Air Force during the Second World War. He became a manager after he retired from playing in 1949, returning to Carlisle United. He later managed Grimsby Town, Workington and Huddersfield Town before moving to become Liverpool manager in December 1959.

Shankly took charge of Liverpool when they were in the Second Division and rebuilt the team into a major force in English and European football. He led Liverpool to the Second Division Championship to gain promotion to the top-flight First Division in 1962, before going on to win three First Division Championships, two FA Cups, four Charity Shields and one UEFA Cup. It was during Shankly's tenure that the club changed to an all-red home strip, and "You'll Never Walk Alone" became the club's anthem. Shankly announced his surprise retirement from football a few weeks after Liverpool had won the 1974 FA Cup final, having managed the club for 15 years, and was succeeded by his long-time assistant Bob Paisley. He led the Liverpool team out for the last time at Wembley for the 1974 FA Charity Shield. He died seven years later, aged 68. Considered one of the greatest football managers of all time, Shankly was among the inaugural inductees into the English Football Hall of Fame in 2002, and the Scottish Football Hall of Fame in 2004.

== Early life ==
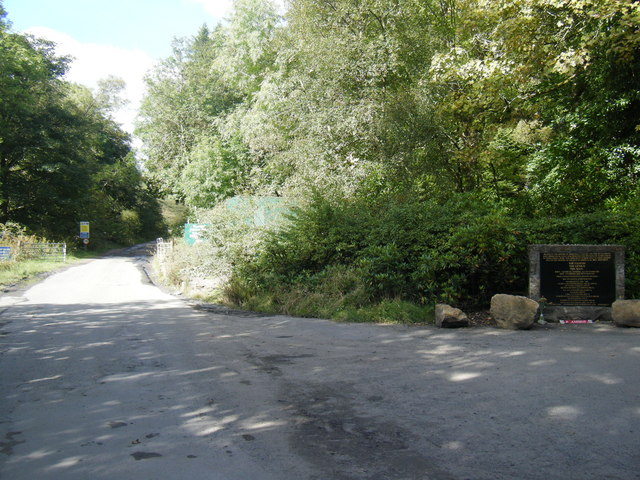
Shankly memorial (to the right) and the lane to Glenbuck

Bill Shankly was born in the small Scottish coal mining village of Glenbuck, Ayrshire, whose population in 1913, the year of Shankly's birth, was around 700. People born there would often move to find work in larger coal mines. As a result, Glenbuck became largely derelict and by the time Shankly's ghost writer John Roberts visited it in 1976, there were only 12 houses left, including a cottage owned by Shankly's sister, Elizabeth, whom Roberts described as "the last of the children of Glenbuck".

Shankly's parents, John and Barbara, lived in one of the Auchenstilloch Cottages with their 10 children; five boys and five girls. William was the ninth child and the youngest boy. Although he was known as Bill throughout his football career, his name in the family was Willie, pronounced [Wullie]. His father was a postman who became a tailor of handmade suits. Despite the football pedigree in his family, he did not play himself.

All five Shankly brothers played professional football and Shankly claimed they could have beaten any five brothers in the world when they were all at their peaks. His brothers were Alec, known as Sandy by the family, who played for Ayr United and Clyde; Jimmy (1902–1972), who played for various clubs including Sheffield United and Southend United; John (1903–1960), who played for Portsmouth and Luton Town; and Bob (1910–1982), who played for Alloa Athletic and Falkirk. Bob became a successful manager, guiding Dundee to victory in the Scottish championship in 1962 and the semi-finals of the European Cup the following year. Their maternal uncles, Robert and William Blyth were professional players who both became club directors at Portsmouth and Carlisle United respectively.

Shankly wrote in his autobiography that times were hard during his upbringing and that hunger was a prevailing condition, especially during the winter months. He admitted that he and his friends used to steal vegetables from nearby farms; bread, biscuits and fruit from suppliers' wagons, and bags of coal from the pits. Shankly admitted the act was wrong but stated these acts were driven by youth, mischief and constant hunger. He said that he and his friends learned from their mistakes and became better people in later years. He was at school from age five until 14. Discipline at both home and school was strict but Shankly said it was character-building. His favourite subject was geography and he played football as often as possible, especially in the school playground, but there was no organised school team.

After Shankly left school in 1928, he worked at a local mine alongside his brother Bob. He did this for two years until the pit closed and he faced unemployment. In his autobiography, he described the life of a miner at some length and mentioned many of the problems such as the sheer hard work, rats, the difficulties of eating and drinking at the coal face. The worst problem was the filth because the miners never felt really clean, even though they would go home to wash in a tub after each shift.

While Shankly was employed as a miner, he played football as often as possible and sometimes went to Glasgow to watch either Celtic or Rangers, sharing his allegiance between the two and ignoring the sectarianism that divides Glasgow. Shankly developed his skills to the point that he was unemployed for only a few months before Carlisle United signed him. He wrote that he had his football future worked out in his mind and that, even when working in the pit, he was only "killing time". He always believed that it was only a matter of time before he became a professional player. He explained that, in football terms, he had always been an optimist with a belief in his destiny and that was the basis of his undying enthusiasm for the sport.

Shankly's village team was called the Glenbuck Cherrypickers, a name probably derived from the 11th Hussars (the "Cherry Pickers"), but he said the club was near extinction when he had a trial and he never actually played for them. Shankly, aged 18, then played part of the 1931–32 season for Cronberry Eglinton, about 12 miles from Glenbuck. He used to cycle to and from the ground. Cronberry were in the Cumnock & District League. Although Shankly had less than one full season at Cronberry, he acknowledged his debt to Scottish Junior Football as he learned a lot, mainly by listening to older players and especially his brothers.

== Playing career ==
=== Carlisle United ===
Shankly had a single season, 1932–33, at Carlisle United, then relatively new to the Football League and playing in the Third Division North, their reserve side playing in the North Eastern League. Shankly was recommended by scout Peter Carruthers, who had seen him playing for Cronberry. He was invited for a month's trial and said it was the first time he had left Scotland. He was signed after just one trial match for Carlisle's reserves against Middlesbrough reserves, even though Carlisle reserves lost the match 6–0. A local newspaper report said that he had worked hard and might develop into a useful left back. In fact, he developed into a top-class right-half.

Shankly made his senior debut on 31 December 1932 in a 2–2 draw against Rochdale and made 16 appearances for the first team. At the end of the season, the reserves won the North Eastern League Cup, defeating Newcastle United reserves 1–0 in the final. In his 1976 autobiography, Shankly stated that he still had the medal.

At this stage of his career, Shankly was assessed as "a hard running, gritty right-half" whose displays brought him much praise and credit. He was considered a promising key young player who was capable of taking Carlisle to greater things. He was paid £4 and ten shillings a week at Carlisle, which he considered a good wage as the top rate at that time was £8. Shankly was happy at Carlisle, which was close to his home at Glenbuck, and he had settled in well with almost a guarantee of first team football. When the opportunity came for him to move on, he was not convinced he wanted to leave.

=== Preston North End ===
Soon after the 1932–33 season ended, Shankly received a telegram from Carlisle United asking him to return as soon as possible because another club wanted to sign him. Arriving at Carlisle, he discovered that the interested club was Preston North End who had offered a transfer fee of £500. The terms for Shankly personally were a fee of £50 plus a £10 signing-on fee and wages of £5 a week (equivalent to £309 in 2025). Shankly's initial reaction was that it was not enough and the deal nearly fell through. His brother Alec pointed out to him that Preston were in the Second Division and a bigger club than Carlisle with the potential to regain First Division status. Alec persuaded him that the opportunity was more important than what he would be paid immediately, stressing that it was what he would get later that counted. Shankly took his brother's advice and signed the Preston contract in a railway carriage.

Shankly began his Preston career in the reserves, who played in the Central League which was a higher standard than the North Eastern League. He made his first team debut on 9 December 1933, three months after his 20th birthday, against Hull City. Shankly created an early goal to help Preston win 5–0, earning him praise in a national newspaper for his "clever passing". With his wholehearted attitude and commitment to the team, he quickly established himself as a first-team regular and became a crowd favourite. Preston fulfilled their potential and gained promotion to the First Division as runners-up to Grimsby Town. It was therefore a successful debut season for Shankly who stayed with Preston until he retired in 1949. His wage was increased to eight pounds a week with six pounds in the summer. In a summary of the 1933–34 season, a Preston correspondent, Walter Pilkington, wrote:

One of this season's discoveries, Bill Shankly, played with rare tenacity and uncommonly good ideas for a lad of 20. He is full of good football and possessed with unlimited energy; he should go far.

In his autobiography, Shankly wrote that Preston had more than held their own in the 1934–35 season and the club was not relegated again until the end of the 1948–49 season in which he left them. Shankly developed into a tough half back, as good as any in the Football League. The outstanding Northern Ireland international Peter Doherty recalled how Shankly dogged his footsteps in one match and kept muttering: "Great wee team, North End, great wee team", subduing Doherty completely as Preston defeated Manchester City 3–1.

In 1936–37, Preston reached the FA Cup final but were well beaten 3–1 by Sunderland at Wembley Stadium. Preston recovered to reach the 1938 FA Cup final in which they defeated Huddersfield Town 1–0 with a penalty scored by George Mutch in the final minute of extra time. As well as winning the FA Cup, Preston finished third in the league. That season marked the pinnacle of Shankly's playing career.

Shankly had just reached his 26th birthday when the Second World War began and the war claimed the peak years of his playing career. He joined the Royal Air Force (RAF) and managed to play in numerous wartime league, cup and exhibition matches for Norwich City, Arsenal, Luton Town, Cardiff City, Lovell's Athletic F.C. and Partick Thistle, depending on where he was stationed (winning the Summer Cup with the Glasgow club in 1945). On 30 May 1942, he played a single game for Liverpool in a 4–1 win over Everton at Anfield. Shankly was keen on boxing and fought as a middleweight in the RAF, winning a trophy when he was stationed in Manchester. He confirmed in his autobiography that his weight as an RAF boxer was 159 pounds (72 kg) and he was only six pounds (2.7 kg) heavier than that in 1976. Shankly met his wife, Nessie, in the RAF (she was in the WAAF and stationed at the same camp) and they married in 1944.

With the resumption of full League football again in the 1946–47 season, Shankly returned to Preston who held his registration, but he was now 33 and coming to the end of his playing days. By 1949, he was Preston's club captain but had lost his place in the first team, which was struggling against relegation despite having Tom Finney in the side. Shankly was a qualified masseur and had decided he wanted to become a coach so, when Carlisle United asked him to become their manager in March of that year, he retired as a player and accepted the job. Shankly's departure from Preston was resented by some at the club and he was refused a benefit match, to which he felt entitled. He described Preston's attitude as the biggest letdown of his life in football.

Shankly had enormous admiration for Tom Finney and devotes more than three pages of his autobiography to Finney's prowess as a footballer. In the 1970s, Shankly was asked how a current star compared to Finney and Shankly replied: "Aye, he's as good as Tommy – but then Tommy's nearly 60 now". Another Preston player admired by Shankly was his Scottish international teammate Andy Beattie, with whom he would later work in management. Shankly was succeeded in the Preston team by Tommy Docherty and Shankly told Docherty that he should "just put the number four shirt on and let it run round by itself because it knows where to go".

=== Scotland ===
Shankly played for Scotland 12 times from 1938 to 1943 in five full and seven wartime internationals. He spoke of his "unbelievable pride" when playing for Scotland against England and how, when confronted by the "Auld Enemy", the Scottish players would become William Wallace or Robert the Bruce for 90 minutes after pulling on the blue jersey. Shankly himself certainly had that spirit when playing for Scotland as confirmed by Alex James, who said of Shankly: "He is a real Scotland player who will fight until he drops".

Shankly made his international debut on 9 April 1938 against England at Wembley; Scotland winning the match 1–0 with a late goal by Tommy Walker. Nine of his Scotland appearances were against England and the others were against Northern Ireland, Wales and Hungary. He was Scotland's captain in the wartime match against England at Hampden Park, attended by 78,000 people on 3 May 1941, but Scotland lost that game 1–3. Perhaps his most memorable international was the wartime game at Wembley on 18 April 1942 when Scotland won 5–4 and Shankly scored his only Scotland goal. A post-match report said that Scotland's success was inspired by "the Busby–Shankly victory service" when Shankly and his future management rival Matt Busby combined to help Scotland's cause. According to the Liverpool website, Shankly's goal was "probably the strangest national goal ever". He took a speculative shot towards goal from 50 yards and the ball bounced over the England goalkeeper's head and into the net. In January 1973, when Shankly was the subject of This Is Your Life broadcast on ITV, the goal was shown and Shankly commented that "they all count and we won".

=== Style and technique ===
Shankly declared in his autobiography that he specialised in what he called "the art of tackling", emphasising that it is an art. He wrote that he was never sent off or booked by a referee. In his view, the art of tackling is in the timing and the sole object is to win the ball. He wrote that even if the opponent is injured in the tackle, it is not a foul if you have timed everything right and you have won the ball. His philosophy, therefore, was to play hard but fair with no cheating. During his playing career, Shankly said he would not argue with referees. He realised after taking the advice of his brothers that it is a waste of time. The referee, he wrote, always wins in the end.

Shankly was always noted for his dedication to football and, in his playing days, would do his own training during the summer months. During the summer of 1933 when he returned to Glenbuck after completing his first season as a professional, he decided to develop his throw-in skills. He was an early exponent of the long throw-in – he practised by throwing balls over a row of houses and the small boys of the village helped by fetching them back for him.

== Management career ==
Shankly wrote in his autobiography that he had long prepared himself for a career as a football manager. He had absorbed all the coaching systems with any useful qualifications and had full confidence in his ability and in himself to be a leader. For him, he had done the hard work and it was simply a question of waiting for an opportunity to present itself. Shankly summed up the essential criteria for success in football management when he claimed he could speak common sense about the game and could spot a good player. In spotting a player, he always applied a basic formula which was that, first and foremost, the player must have both ability and courage. Other attributes were physical fitness and willingness to work, especially to struggle against the odds.

=== Carlisle United ===
Shankly began his managerial career at Carlisle United, the club where his professional playing career had started. Carlisle in the 1948–49 season were struggling in the bottom half of the Third Division North and finding it difficult to attract southern-based players because of the city's geographic remoteness in the far north of England. Shankly's work ethic transformed the team who finished 15th in 1948–49 after he had been in charge for only the last few matches. They improved to ninth in 1949–50 and then to third in 1950–51, almost gaining promotion.

One of Shankly's players at Carlisle was Geoff Twentyman, then a promising young centre half, who was later transferred to Liverpool. After he retired from playing, Twentyman became chief scout at Liverpool, working with Shankly and finding several outstandingly talented players.

Shankly used psychology to motivate his players, for example telling them that the opposition had had a very tiring journey and were not fit to play the match. He urged the local population to support the team and would use the public address system at matches to tell the crowd about his team changes and how his strategy was improving the team. Shankly recalled that Brunton Park was dilapidated, writing that the main stand was falling to pieces and the terraces derelict. He even burned all the kits. When the team was travelling to Lincoln City, he saw a sportswear shop in Doncaster and stopped the coach to buy a full set of kits in which the team played at Lincoln.

Season ticket sales in 1950–51 reached an all-time high and Carlisle challenged strongly for promotion as well as achieving a draw with Arsenal at Highbury in the FA Cup. It ended badly, however, because Shankly accused the club's board of reneging on a bonus promise for the players should the team finish in the top three of the league. He resigned and accepted an offer from Grimsby Town. Shankly's overall record in league football at Carlisle was 42 wins and 22 defeats from 95 matches.

=== Grimsby Town ===
After an unsuccessful interview at Liverpool, Shankly moved to manage Grimsby Town in June 1951. He said in his autobiography that there was greater potential at Grimsby than at Carlisle. His main problems were that Grimsby had been relegated twice in recent seasons, dropping from the First to the Third Division, and some good players had been transferred before he arrived. Even so, Shankly believed he still had good players to work with and was able to buy some additional players on the transfer market for low fees.

Grimsby made a strong challenge for promotion in 1951–52 but finished second, three points behind Lincoln City (only one team was promoted from Division Three North, with one from Division Three South). Shankly insisted in his autobiography that his Grimsby team was:

Pound for pound, and class for class, the best football team I have seen in England since the war. In the league they were in, they played football nobody else could play. Everything was measured, planned and perfected and you could not wish to see more entertaining football.

Shankly's biographer Stephen Kelly quotes the "pound for pound" analysis but qualifies it as another of Shankly's slight, though well-meant, exaggerations. Kelly added that this kind of talk by Shankly could only boost morale at the club.

Shankly made great use of five-a-side football in training at Grimsby, playing these games as if they were competitive cup or league matches. The games would last an hour each time. Shankly worked on set pieces such as throw-ins and tried to devise a method of counter-attacking from corners conceded.

Grimsby's ageing team made a bright start in 1952–53 with five straight wins but eventually slipped and finished in fifth place. In 1953–54, Shankly became disillusioned when the board could not give him money to buy new players. He was reluctant to promote some promising reserves because of loyalty to the older players (a fault that was to resurface at Liverpool years later) and he finally resigned in January 1954, citing the board's lack of ambition as his main reason. In his autobiography, he said that he and his wife were feeling homesick in Grimsby and, when an opportunity came to manage Workington, he was attracted to the challenge partly because they would be closer to Scotland. Shankly's record in league football at Grimsby was 62 wins and 35 defeats from 118 matches.

=== Workington ===
Although the Workington team was close to the bottom of the Third Division North, Shankly saw it as a challenge and attacked the job with all of his usual enthusiasm and relish. Workington rose to 18th by the end of the 1953–54 season and so did not have to apply for re-election. In 1954–55, the team finished a creditable eighth and saw a rise in attendances from 6,000 to 8,000.

Workington operated on a shoestring and Shankly had to do much of the administration work himself, including answering the telephone and dealing with the mail by using an old typewriter to answer letters. In addition, he had the risky job of going to the bank each week to collect the payroll. One of his main problems was sharing the ground with the local rugby league club and Shankly was very concerned about the damage done to the playing surface by the rugby players. The situation led to numerous arguments with the club's board which, as Kelly records, included a majority of rugby league men whose interest in football took second place to rugby.

Shankly resigned on 15 November 1955 to take up the post of assistant manager at Huddersfield Town, working with his old friend Andy Beattie. His record in league football at Workington was 35 wins and 27 defeats from 85 matches.

=== Huddersfield Town ===
Shankly's initial role at Huddersfield was as reserve team coach. He found himself in charge of several promising youngsters who soon graduated to the first team after Town were relegated to the Second Division at the end of the 1955–56 season. Beattie resigned in the next season and, on 5 November 1956, Shankly succeeded him as manager. On Christmas Eve, he gave a first team debut to 16-year-old prospect Denis Law. Law said Shankly "made you believe you were something special", and club historian Ian Thomas stated, "Denis Law recalls the players hanging on his every word". Another prospect in his team was left back Ray Wilson who went on to become Huddersfield's most capped player before joining Everton. Shankly did not gain promotion at Huddersfield, the team finishing 12th in 1956–57, ninth in 1957–58 and 14th in 1958–59.

Other players in Shankly's Huddersfield team were Ken Taylor, who was an England Test cricketer; striker Les Massie and captain Bill McGarry. On 21 December 1957, Huddersfield lost 7–6 to Charlton Athletic, who played most of the match with ten men, after Huddersfield were leading 5–1 with just 27 minutes remaining. Shankly described it as one of the most amazing games he had ever seen. On another occasion, Huddersfield beat Liverpool 5–0 with ten men and Shankly recalled the Liverpool directors leaving the ground in single file as if they were in a funeral procession.

Disillusioned by a board that wanted to sell his best players without offering money to buy replacements, Shankly felt stifled by Huddersfield's lack of ambition and was delighted in November 1959 to receive an approach for his services by Liverpool. He recalled how Liverpool chairman Tom (T. V.) Williams asked him if he would like to manage the best club in the country, to which Shankly replied: "Why, is Matt Busby packing up?" Shankly decided to think about the offer as he realised the great potential at Liverpool, who like Huddersfield were in the Second Division at that time. Rumours began and were fuelled by Liverpool's visit to Leeds Road on 28 November. Although Huddersfield won the game 1–0, Shankly accepted the Liverpool offer and resigned his position as Huddersfield manager at a board meeting on 1 December 1959. His league record at Huddersfield was 49 wins and 47 defeats in 129 matches.

=== Liverpool ===
==== Early years (1959–1964) ====
My idea was to build Liverpool into a bastion of invincibility. Had Napoleon had that idea he would have conquered the bloody world. My idea was to build Liverpool up and up until eventually everyone would have to submit and give in.

When Shankly arrived at Anfield on Monday, 14 December 1959, Liverpool had been in the Second Division for five years, and had been defeated by non-league Worcester City in the 1958–59 FA Cup. Anfield itself was in disrepair with no means of watering the pitch and Shankly insisted the club spend £3,000 to rectify that. Shankly described the training ground at Melwood as "a shambles". The Liverpool squad he inherited consisted largely of average players and some promising reserves.

In spite of the difficulties, Shankly quickly felt at home in his new club and believed he shared an immediate bond with the supporters, whom he saw as his kind of people. He quickly established working relationships with the coaching staff of Bob Paisley, Joe Fagan and Reuben Bennett who shared his views about loyalty to each other and to the club. Paisley's influence at Liverpool was crucial for, as Kelly puts it, Shankly was "the great motivating force behind Liverpool, but it was Paisley who was the tactician". One aspect of the quartet's legacy to football was the conversion of an old storage room into what became known as the "Boot Room", which was used for tactical discussion while cleaning and repairing boots. Although Shankly believed he had an excellent coaching staff, hence his first decision at the club was to retain them rather than bring in his own, a decision which sportswriter John Keith says displayed "remarkable football foresight", the playing staff were not so impressive – indeed, Shankly said of the latter:

After only one match I knew that the team as a whole was not good enough. I made up my mind that we needed strengthening through the middle, a goalkeeper and a centre half who between them could stop goals, and somebody up front to create goals and score them.

To deal with what he saw as a below average squad, he placed 24 players on the transfer list. All of them had left the club within one year. Shankly pursued his strength through the middle goal and knew which three players he needed to achieve it.

The foundations Shankly laid at Melwood manifested in success at Anfield. In an age where long, punishing training runs forced players to plod around on the pavement were the norm, Shankly opted to mandate fitness work be done with a ball at the foot of his players. Small-sided games, proper warm-up and cool-down periods, periodised technical workouts, circuit training and segmentation practices created a standard that would eventually come to be known as 'The Liverpool Way'.

— The revolutionary training methods implemented by Shankly at the club's training ground, Melwood.

Melwood was overgrown and had only an old wooden cricket pavilion. Shankly commented that one of the pitches looked as if bombs had been dropped on it and he asked if the Germans had been over in the war. He instituted a development programme to cultivate the site and modernise the facilities. In the meantime, he arranged for the players to meet and change at Anfield before going to and from Melwood by bus. According to Kelly, Liverpool's eventual success was based on hard work done in the training system that Shankly, Paisley, Fagan and Bennett introduced at Melwood. Shankly deplored long-distance running on roads and insisted that, apart from warm-up exercises or any special exercises needed to overcome injuries, the players trained on grass using a ball. Everything was done systematically with players rotating through exercise routines in groups with the purpose of achieving set targets. These would first cycle through athletic exercises, like skipping or squats, before moving on to football-specific functions, such as heading the ball or chipping it. Five-a-side games, as at all Shankly's earlier clubs, were at the heart of the system and he again insisted on these being as competitive as league matches. Shankly trained among the players in order to closely monitor them, instructing anyone overworking to "simmer down", or those who needed to be "encouraged occasionally to do a little more".

One particular routine designed to develop stamina, reflexes and ball skills was the "sweat box" which Shankly described as: "using boards like the walls of a house with players playing the ball off one wall and on to the next; the ball was played against the boards, you controlled it, turned around and took it again". Shankly got the idea from a routine he had seen Tom Finney use at Preston to hone his skills. After experimenting with the routine, he set the players a limit of two minutes per session. The system was geared to Shankly's simple philosophy of "pass and move", which formed the basis of Liverpool's strategy. Shankly insisted on suitable cooling-off periods after training (now called "warming down") before the players took a bath and had a meal. The team changed the studs in their boots to suit all playing conditions. Shankly summarised the entire strategy in terms of attention to detail with nothing left to chance.

Liverpool's recovery depended on new players being acquired and, in his autobiography, Shankly recalled the struggles he had with the board to make them realise the club's potential and the need to spend money on good players. He said there were times when he felt like walking out. He found a valuable ally in Eric Sawyer, of the Littlewoods pools organisation, who joined the board not long after Shankly's appointment and shared Shankly's vision of Liverpool as the best club in England. At one board meeting in 1961 when Shankly insisted the club make offers for two players in Scotland, the board's initial response was that they could not afford them, but Sawyer stepped in and said: "We can't afford not to buy them".

The two Scottish players were centre half Ron Yeats and centre forward Ian St John from Dundee United and Motherwell respectively. With Sawyer's help, Shankly signed them both in the spring of 1961 and challenged the Liverpool board to sack him if they could not play. At a press conference when Yeats came to Liverpool, Shankly emphasised Yeats' height by inviting the journalists to "go and walk round him; he's a colossus!" Goalkeeper Tommy Lawrence came through the club's junior teams, so Shankly now had his "strength through the middle" and the team building continued with the acquisition of wing half Gordon Milne from Preston. Other players developed at Anfield were Jimmy Melia, Ronnie Moran, Alan A'Court and the future England internationals Gerry Byrne and Roger Hunt. Shankly said of goalscorer Hunt the first time he saw him: "Christ, this one can play!" Liverpool had finished third in both 1959–60 and 1960–61 (only the top two clubs were promoted); but the new team gained promotion in the 1961–62 season by winning the Second Division championship, Hunt scoring 41 goals.

Liverpool consolidated in 1962–63, finishing eighth in their first top flight season under Shankly's management. Significant signings were wing half Willie Stevenson from Rangers in 1962 and left winger Peter Thompson from Preston in 1963. Paying £37,000 for the electric dribbler Thompson, Shankly described the deal as "daylight robbery", and later said "I have no hesitation in placing Peter up among the all-time greats". Liverpool's youth system produced more future England internationals in Ian Callaghan (record-holder for most appearances for Liverpool with 857 games), Tommy Smith and Chris Lawler. Smith, a tough, uncompromising defender, Shankly quipped he "wasn't born, he was quarried". The hard work paid off in 1963–64 when Liverpool won their sixth First Division title, ending the season with a 5–0 defeat of Arsenal at Anfield. According to Roger Hunt, the secret of Liverpool's success was that, under Shankly, they were the fittest team in the country. In 1964, Jimmy Melia was transferred to Wolverhampton Wanderers; with Shankly buying Arsenal's utility player Geoff Strong for £40,000; this was Liverpool's last significant transfer activity until 1967.

==== 1964 to 1970 ====
One of Shankly's greatest ambitions when he joined Liverpool was to win the FA Cup and, after he signed Yeats and St John, he told the club directors that they would win it with these two players in the team. It was St John who scored the winning goal in May 1965 when Liverpool won the FA Cup for the first time in the club's history with a 2–1 extra time victory over Leeds United at Wembley. In his autobiography, Shankly recounted that among his many achievements, winning the 1965 FA Cup final was his greatest day in football. Prior to the cup triumph the club had been league champions six times, and Shankly said, "To think a club like Liverpool had never won the FA Cup was unbelievable. So many had prayed for it to happen over all the years but it had never come to pass. So when we beat Leeds at Wembley in 1965, the emotion was unforgettable. Grown men were crying and it was the greatest feeling any human could have to see what we had done." Ahead of the final The Beatles had sent Shankly a telegram wishing the team luck, and Shankly appeared on the BBC's Desert Island Discs where he picked the club's anthem "You'll Never Walk Alone" as his eighth and final selection. "YNWA" had become the club's anthem two years earlier, with its singer Gerry Marsden recalling: "Bill came up to me. He said, 'Gerry my son, I have given you a football team and you have given us a song'."

The introduction of the all-red strip had a huge psychological effect. I went home that night and I said to my wife Ness: "You know something... tonight I went out onto Anfield and for the first time there was a glow like a fire was burning. Our game against Anderlecht was a night of milestones. We wore the all-red strip for the first time. Christ, the players looked like giants. And we played like giants.

Liverpool made their European debut in 1964–65, competing in the European Cup and reaching the semi-finals. In the second round, the club was drawn against the formidable Anderlecht. The day before the first leg on 25 November 1964, Shankly decided to experiment with the Liverpool kit. Liverpool played in red shirts with white shorts and white socks with red stripes, but Shankly and Ian St John had the idea of an all-red kit that would give the impression the players were taller. St John recalled in his autobiography: "He [Shankly] thought the colour scheme would carry psychological impact – red for danger, red for power." Liverpool played in all-red only for European matches but that season adopted the colour permanently.

Three days after winning the FA Cup, Liverpool defeated European champions Inter Milan 3–1 at Anfield in the semi-final first leg with a performance that was saluted by Inter's coach Helenio Herrera. The second leg at the San Siro remains controversial because, according to Shankly, the match was "a war" which Liverpool lost 3–0 and so were knocked out of the competition 4–3 on aggregate. Eleven years later, Shankly maintained that two of Inter's goals were illegal. Even today, the Liverpool website describes the match by saying that Liverpool were denied at the semi-final stage by a dishonest referee in Milan. According to Kelly, however, video evidence shows that the two disputed goals were actually legitimate. Shankly said after the defeat in Milan that the Inter fans were going mad because they were so pleased to have beaten Liverpool and he insisted it proved the high standard to which the Liverpool team had raised itself. In the 1964–65 First Division, Liverpool dropped from first to seventh with 13 fewer points than the previous season, perhaps due to the exertion of lengthy participation in the FA and European Cups.

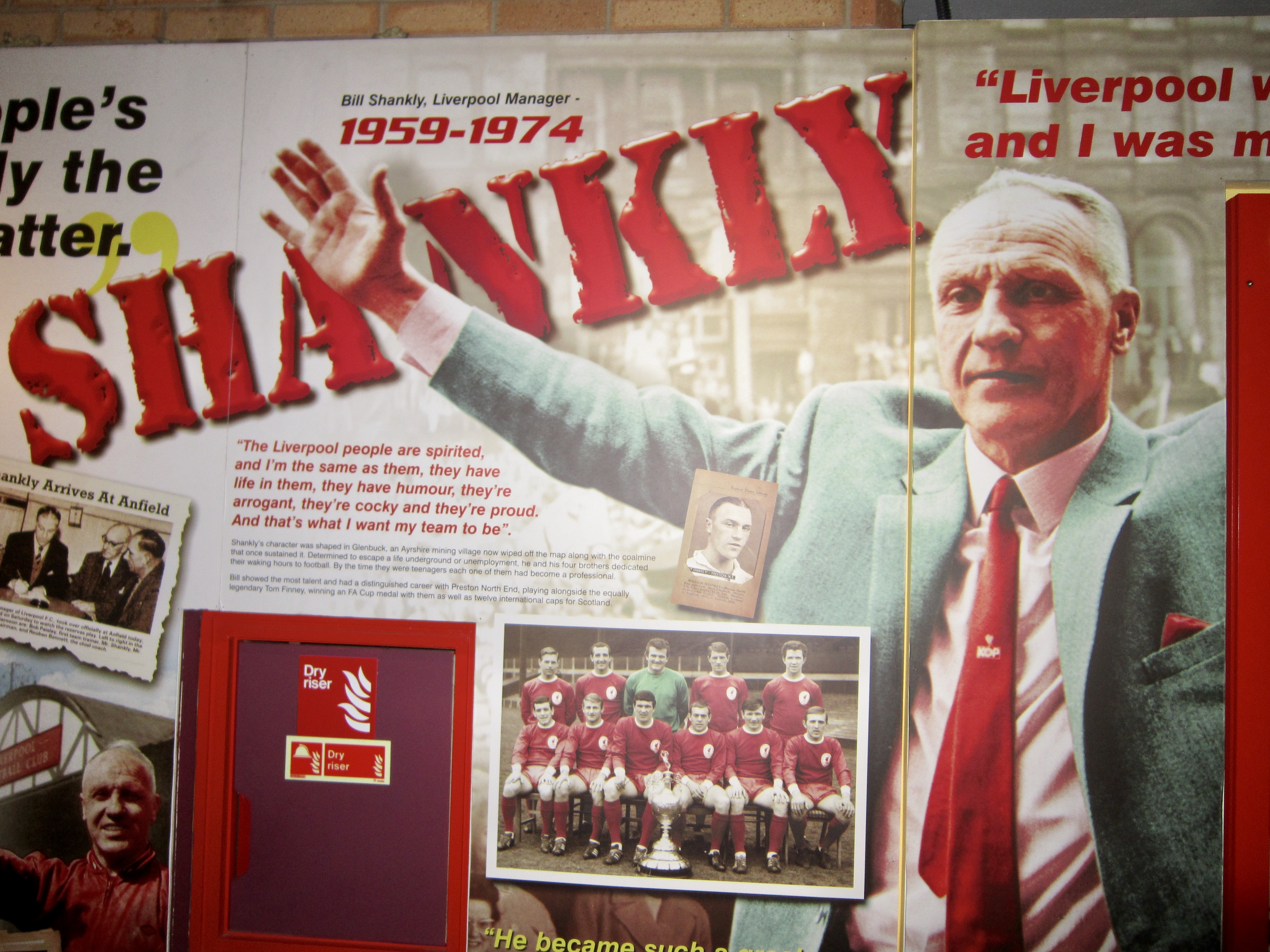
Image of Shankly in the Liverpool F.C. museum which also features his mid-1960s league title winning team

In 1965–66, Liverpool regained the First Division title and reached the final of the European Cup Winners' Cup at Hampden Park, where they lost 2–1 in extra time to Borussia Dortmund. Shankly's summary of that final, played on a wet night, was that the team did not play well and gave away "two silly goals". Shankly and Paisley had learned a great deal about European football which Liverpool would eventually turn into trophies. Their strategy in two-legged ties would be containment away and attack at home. Shankly had applied the principle in a preliminary round tie against Juventus when Liverpool were away in the first leg. Despite Juventus taking the lead after 81 minutes, Shankly ordered his players to ensure the deficit was only one goal. Liverpool then switched to all-out attack in the second leg at Anfield and won 2–0 (2–1 aggregate).

Liverpool began the 1966–67 season by beating neighbours Everton in the FA Charity Shield match but the team were never really in contention for major honours that season, finishing fifth in the league. Shankly recognised the potential of Blackpool teenager Emlyn Hughes, a future England captain, and signed him for £65,000 in February 1967. Liverpool's performance in the 1966–67 European Cup was poor and, after struggling to overcome FC Petrolul Ploiești in the first round, they were well beaten in the last 16 by Ajax Amsterdam, inspired by 19-year-old Johan Cruyff. Ajax won 7–3 on aggregate after defeating Liverpool 5–1 in Amsterdam. Several years later, in his autobiography, Shankly still complained that the match in Amsterdam should never have started because of fog and, although Liverpool lost 5–1, he still thought Liverpool would win the tie at Anfield. Although Shankly claimed to have been unworried about the Ajax defeat, he acknowledged that he was examining the team and planning ahead. The Liverpool site argues that Shankly was mistaken in his decision at this time to postpone team rebuilding.

Liverpool improved their league performances over the next two years, finishing third in 1967–68 and then second in 1968–69, although to Shankly himself it was "a mediocre time in the late 1960s as we prepared for the 1970s". He made two controversial signings in this period which did not turn out as he had hoped. In 1967, he signed striker Tony Hateley from Chelsea for a club record £96,000 and, despite scoring 27 goals, then felt obliged to transfer him to Coventry City only a year later as his game did not fit Liverpool's pass-and-move style. He wrote that bad luck and injuries disrupted the progress of two other prospects Alf Arrowsmith and Gordon Wallace; Shankly had compared the latter to Tom Finney. In September 1968, he paid £100,000 (equivalent to £1,529,355 in 2025) to Wolverhampton Wanderers for their teenage striker Alun Evans who thus became "football's first £100,000 teenager". Evans started well and produced some outstanding performances during his four years at the club but Shankly eventually had to sell him to Aston Villa. He later recalled that Evans was scarred by a glass in a nightclub incident which, in Shankly's opinion, had a detrimental impact on his career.

The only long-term success that Shankly had in the transfer market in the late 1960s was his signing of Emlyn Hughes, who went on to captain Liverpool to victory in the European Cup. Otherwise, he did not significantly change the team until the 1969–70 season when Liverpool finished fifth in the league championship, a long way behind the winners, their local rivals Everton. Shankly was characteristically defiant whenever Everton got the better of Liverpool and, although he liked and respected everyone connected with Everton, would always talk up Liverpool at Everton's expense. Typical of this was his joke about the city having two great football teams – Liverpool and Liverpool reserves.

Shankly knew he needed to add new blood to the side — and he had earmarked Heighway as someone who could help kick-start another push for glory. "He was talking about [replacing] players who were, of course, stars in my eyes," explained Heighway. "Shanks was saying, 'He's finished, he's finished, he's finished'."

— Liverpool F.C. website on Shankly building his second great side, which included the winger Steve Heighway.

In the 1969–70 FA Cup quarter final, Liverpool played against struggling Second Division side Watford at Vicarage Road and lost 1–0 after a very poor performance. The Liverpool site records that the defeat signalled the end for St John, Hunt, Byrne, Yeats and Lawrence; the incomers included goalkeeper Ray Clemence, defenders Alec Lindsay and Larry Lloyd, striker John Toshack, midfielder Brian Hall and winger Steve Heighway. Apart from Hall who graduated through the reserves, they were all signed from clubs in lower divisions or even, in the case of Heighway, from non-league football. Heighway, at university when Shankly met him at his student accommodation to offer him a deal, would go on to be immortalised in a Kop chant in recognition, for what the club's site states, for having "dazzled audiences the length of the country." Adding the new players to Tommy Smith, Ian Callaghan, Chris Lawler and Emlyn Hughes, Shankly formed the nucleus of a second great team which went on to dominate English and European football in the 1970s.

Many of the new players came to Liverpool because of a new scouting system created by Shankly in 1967 and placed under the control of new chief scout Geoff Twentyman, who had played for Shankly at Carlisle and had then spent several seasons at Liverpool, retiring shortly before Shankly's appointment. According to Stephen Kelly, hiring Twentyman as chief scout was "perhaps Shankly's finest signing ever". It was through Twentyman that Liverpool found the new players and, after Shankly retired, Twentyman gave sterling service to Bob Paisley and Joe Fagan by finding players including Phil Neal, Alan Hansen and Ian Rush. As always, Shankly kept things simple and Twentyman was told to look for a prospect's basic qualities which were the abilities to pass the ball and move into position to receive a pass. Shankly also wanted Twentyman to check the player's personality and ensure he had the right attitude for a professional footballer. Above all, said Twentyman, "he wanted to know if the lad had the heart to play for Liverpool". Although Shankly sometimes paid large transfer fees he was loath to do so and Twentyman's brief was to find young players so he (Shankly) could mould them into what he wanted.

==== 1970 to 1974 ====
The new team began promisingly in 1970–71 by retaining fifth place in the league and reaching the semi-finals of the Inter-Cities Fairs Cup where they lost 1–0 to Leeds United. The highlight of Liverpool's European campaign that season was a 4–1 aggregate victory in the quarter-final over Bayern Munich. For the first time since winning the competition in 1965, Liverpool reached the FA Cup final but, as in the Fairs Cup, experience was the major factor and Shankly's young team were beaten 2–1 by league champions Arsenal despite having taken the lead in extra time through a Steve Heighway goal. Watching from the sidelines was another new player whom Shankly had recently signed from Scunthorpe United for £35,000 on Twentyman's recommendation. This was Kevin Keegan and he was such an important addition to the new Liverpool team that Shankly devoted an entire chapter of his autobiography to him entitled A Boy Called Keegan. Shankly summarised Keegan as "the inspiration of the new team".

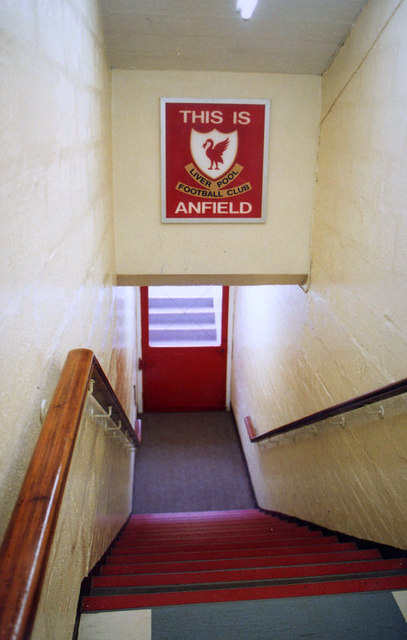
The "THIS IS ANFIELD" sign in the players' tunnel was installed by Shankly in 1972 to instil fear into the opposition.

In Keegan's first season, 1971–72, Liverpool missed out on winning the First Division by a single point, the title going to Brian Clough's Derby County. Shankly maintained that Liverpool were denied a definite penalty in their crucial away match against Derby and then had a good goal disallowed towards the end of their final match against Arsenal. Both decisions cost the team a vital point which would have been enough to claim first place. Shankly took encouragement from the team's overall form, especially as they had a strong finish to the season, and he was confident of success in 1972–73.

Shankly had always been noted for his use of psychology, both to encourage his own players and to raise doubt in the minds of opponents. One of his lasting innovations is the "THIS IS ANFIELD" plaque secured to the wall above the players' tunnel. Coupled with the roar of the crowd, it was designed to intimidate. Shankly stated the plaque "is to remind our lads who they're playing for, and to remind the opposition who they're playing against". In the first match after it was erected, Liverpool defeated Newcastle United 5–0 on 18 March 1972, despite an attempt by Malcolm Macdonald to joke about the sign. Shankly would try to boost the confidence of his own players by announcing that a key opponent was unfit. When Keegan was about to play against Bobby Moore for the first time, Shankly told him that Moore had been out at a nightclub and was hungover. Afterwards, Keegan having produced an outstanding performance against the equally outstanding Moore, Shankly told him that Moore had been brilliant that day and Keegan would never play against anyone better.

In 1972–73, Liverpool won the club's eighth league title and their third under Shankly. On 30 December 1972 the team beat Crystal Palace at Anfield to make it 21 consecutive home wins in the league. This was the longest run in English top-flight history until it was surpassed by Jürgen Klopp's Liverpool who made it 22 consecutive home wins in March 2020. A massive bonus for the club was winning the 1973 UEFA Cup, the club's first European success. In the two-legged final they faced Borussia Mönchengladbach, whom Shankly rated the best team in Europe. The first leg at Anfield had to be played twice after an abandonment due to heavy rain which flooded the pitch. Shankly had left John Toshack out of the team but then, having studied the Borussia defence, recalled him for the rematch the following night. Toshack used his height and heading ability to great effect and created two goals for Keegan as Liverpool won 3–0. The second leg in Mönchengladbach was a different story as Borussia took an early 2–0 lead and Shankly admitted he thought the final was lost, but Liverpool held on to win the final by an aggregate score of 3–2. It was the first time an English club had won both the league title and a European trophy in the same season.

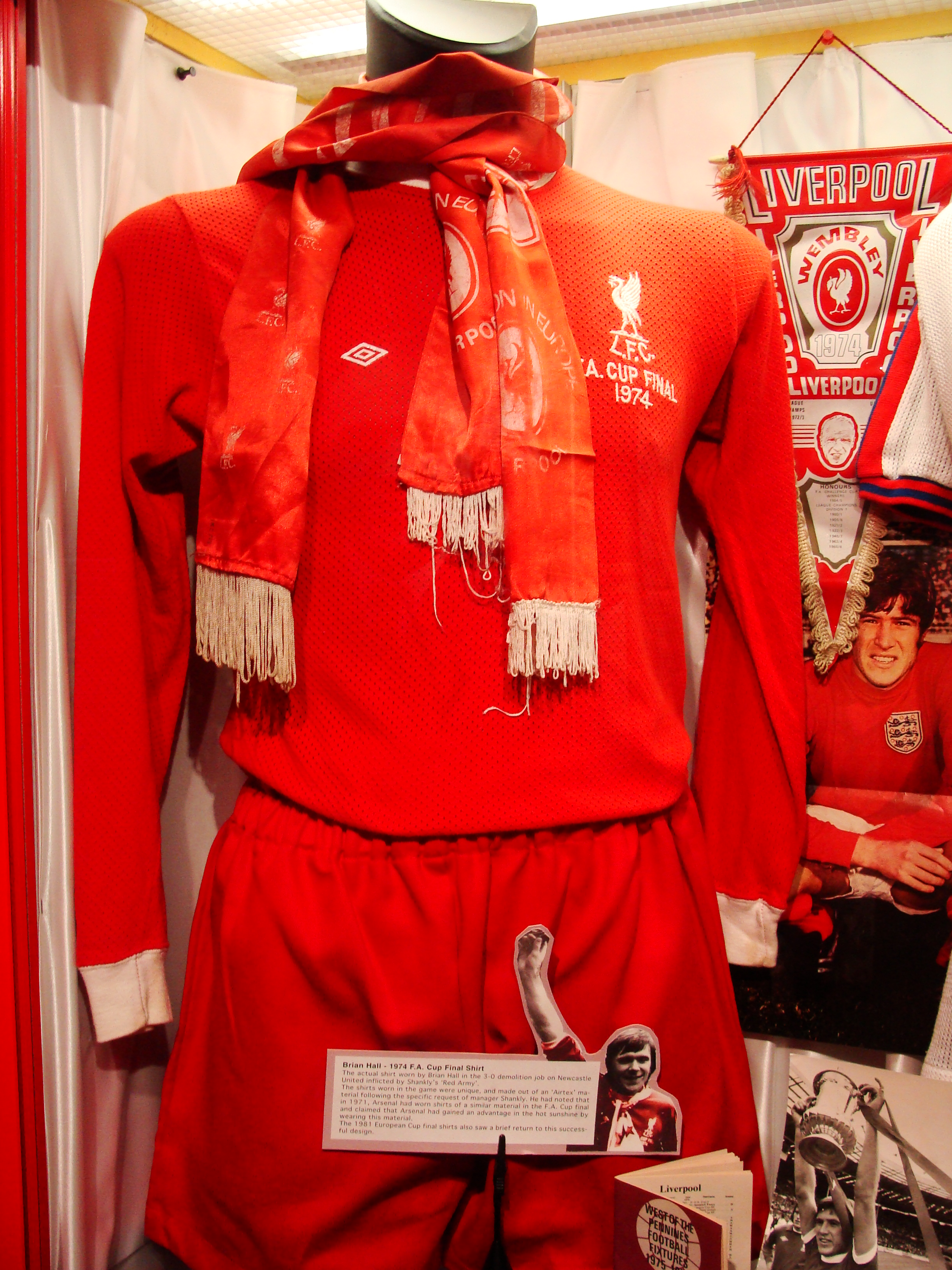
The all-red home strip worn by Brian Hall in the club's 1974 FA Cup final win, Shankly's last competitive game in charge

Liverpool were well beaten by Red Star Belgrade in the second round of the 1973–74 European Cup, and lost out to Leeds in the First Division, finishing second. In the third round of the FA Cup, Liverpool had to score a late equaliser to draw 2–2 at home against Fourth Division Doncaster Rovers but recovered to win the replay and then go all the way to the final. In what proved to be Shankly's last competitive game in charge, Liverpool produced a superb second half performance to defeat Newcastle 3–0 at Wembley. The passing move for the third goal, Keegan's second, saw the commentator exclaim: "Newcastle were undressed! They were absolutely stripped naked!", while Liverpool defender Phil Thompson called the match "the best display of my long time at Anfield."

=== Relationship with fans ===
In his autobiography, Shankly wrote: "Right from the start as a manager [i.e., when he was at Carlisle] I tried to show that the fans are the people that matter. You've got to know how to treat them (and) have them on your side". This was particularly true at Liverpool and Shankly said he was made for Liverpool where the people that matter most are the ones who come through the turnstiles. He added that a manager has got to identify himself with the people because their team is something that really matters to them. In return, he said, the support of the Liverpool fans for their team had been incredible.

Bill Shankly during a lap of honour at Anfield in April 1973, wearing the scarf thrown to him by a Liverpool fan

In April 1973, when Shankly and the team were showing off the League Championship trophy to the fans on the Kop, he saw a policeman fling aside a Liverpool scarf which had been thrown in Shankly's direction. Shankly retrieved the scarf and wore it. He said to the policeman: "Don't you do that. That's precious". Shankly saw the offer of the scarf as a mark of respect which deserved his respect in return.

Shankly emphasised the importance of communication with the supporters. At Carlisle, rather than writing in the programme, he used the public address system to speak and explain his team changes and his views about the previous match. At Workington, he would answer supporters' letters in person, using an old typewriter. He said he preferred to phone business people as he would put as little as possible in writing when dealing with them. He would readily obtain match tickets for fans whom he considered to be deserving cases and wrote in his autobiography that he would give people anything within reason. A young Everton fan wrote to Shankly saying while he did not like Liverpool was it possible he could have tickets for the Merseyside derby. Two tickets were sent with Shankly observing: "I admire the boy's honesty."

Shankly formed a special bond with the Liverpool supporters and, at the end of the 1961–62 season when Liverpool won the Second Division championship, he told the Liverpool Echo: "In all sincerity, I can say that they are the greatest crowd of supporters in the game". In Tommy Smith's view, Shankly was completely in tune with the city of Liverpool; he loved the supporters and they loved him, mainly because they knew he understood them. John Keith writes, "His bond with the Liverpool supporters — "the people", as he called them, was surely the most powerful football has ever experienced." On his connection with Liverpool supporters, Shankly: "I'm just one of the people who stands on the Kop. They think the same as I do, and I think the same as they do".

Liverpool is not only a club. It's an institution. And my aim was to bring the people close to the club and the team and for them to be accepted part of it. The effect was that wives brought their late husband's ashes to Anfield and scattered them on the pitch after saying a little prayer. I said to them: 'In you come, you're welcome', and they trotted in by the dozen. One young boy got killed at his work and a bus load of 50 people came to Anfield one Sunday to scatter his ashes at the Kop end. So people not only support Liverpool when they're alive. They support them when they are dead. This is the true story of Liverpool. This is possibly why Liverpool are so great. There is no hypocrisy about it. It is sheer honesty."

— Shankly (who had his own ashes scattered at Anfield) on instilling the club's connection with the fans.

Regarded as a great orator who stirred emotions among the fanbase, following the 1971 FA Cup final which Liverpool lost to Arsenal, Shankly and the players toured the city of Liverpool where people turned out to greet the gallant losers. Standing on the balcony of St George's Hall, Shankly overlooked a crowd of over 100,000 Liverpool fans, and delivered one of his most famous speeches. Holding his arms out wide as silence descended on the fans below, he began by lauding the "show of red strength", and later stated: "Since I've come here to Liverpool, to Anfield, I've drummed it into our players, time and again, that they are privileged to play for you. And if they didn't believe me, they believe me now." Commenting on the mood of the crowd, a moved Peter Robinson, club secretary of Liverpool, told a reporter, "Bill's got such power of oratory that if he told them to march through the Mersey Tunnel and pillage Birkenhead, they'd do it".

== Retirement from Liverpool ==
Shankly was 60 when Liverpool won the 1974 FA Cup final and said in his autobiography that, on returning to the dressing room at the end of the match, he felt tired from all the years. His mind was made up and he knew he was going to retire. His wife, Nessie, had asked him to retire a year earlier but he decided that was not the right time. Tommy Smith said that Shankly's feelings for Nessie were undoubtedly a major reason for his decision. In 1974, he decided that he could leave Liverpool with pride in a job well done and only one regret, which was that he did not win the European Cup.

Shankly had considered retirement in previous years. The Liverpool secretary Peter Robinson was initially blasé in 1974 but, when he realised Shankly was serious this time, tried to make him change his mind. Shankly's granddaughter, Karen Gill, said to The Observer in 2009: "I think that perhaps it was tiredness, that football had taken its toll on him". In her 2006 book about her grandfather, Karen Gill said Shankly never professed anything privately about retirement that he did not declare publicly. She did not agree that there was any hidden motive behind his decision and she thought Brian Clough's view about tiredness was probably correct.

Shankly's retirement was officially and surprisingly announced at a press conference called by Liverpool on 12 July 1974. Chairman, John Smith, said in his opening address:

It is with great regret that I as chairman of Liverpool Football Club have to inform you that Mr Shankly has intimated that he wishes to retire from active participation in league football. And the board has with extreme reluctance accepted his decision. I would like to at this stage place on record the board's great appreciation of Mr Shankly's magnificent achievements over the period of his managership.

On his decision to retire, Shankly: "It was the most difficult thing in the world, when I went to tell the chairman. It was like walking to the electric chair." On the same day of his retirement, Ray Kennedy signed for a club record £200,000, with Shankly, who had admired Kennedy for years, stating "maybe it will be said that one of the last things I did at this club was to sign a great new player". Shankly soon regretted his decision to retire and tried to continue his involvement with the club, mainly by turning up for team training at Melwood. He said he still wanted the involvement as the club had become his life. He soon stopped going to Melwood because he felt there was some resentment and people were asking what he was doing there. He still attended matches, but sat in the stand away from the directors and staff. He was especially annoyed that Liverpool did not invite him to attend away matches as the club's guest. When, finally, he was invited to travel with them to the away leg of the 1976 UEFA Cup final in Bruges, he was accommodated in a separate hotel and said he found that insulting. Shankly contrasted Liverpool's attitude with what he encountered at other clubs, including Liverpool's great rivals Everton and Manchester United, where he was received warmly. He recalled Manchester United manager Tommy Docherty's comment to a Liverpool director that he (Shankly) was welcome at Old Trafford. About Everton, once his greatest rivals, he wrote that he had been received more warmly by Everton than by Liverpool. He said it was a scandal that he needed to say that about the club he had helped to build.

From Liverpool's point of view, the situation was that Shankly had retired and the club had to move on. Shankly did not understand that, by turning up for training at Melwood, he was effectively undermining Bob Paisley's status as manager. On one visit to Melwood, a player opined to Shankly that Paisley had made a good start in the job. Shankly retorted: "I could have left a monkey in charge!" Shankly's visits even went as far as actually taking over the training. Tommy Smith recalled that Shankly as manager never ran training and would only speak to Paisley, Fagan and Bennett about what needed to be done. As a visitor at Melwood, he began to intervene and Paisley's initial pleasure on seeing him soon turned to polite embarrassment. Eventually, Paisley had to point out to Shankly that he did not work there any more, that it was now Paisley's team and that he had things which he wanted to do with the team. According to Toshack: "It was difficult for Bob, having him hanging around. We're not just talking about any member of the coaching staff who's retired, who just came to Melwood to have a bit of jogging around and a shower and that was it. Shanks was Liverpool; he was an institution."

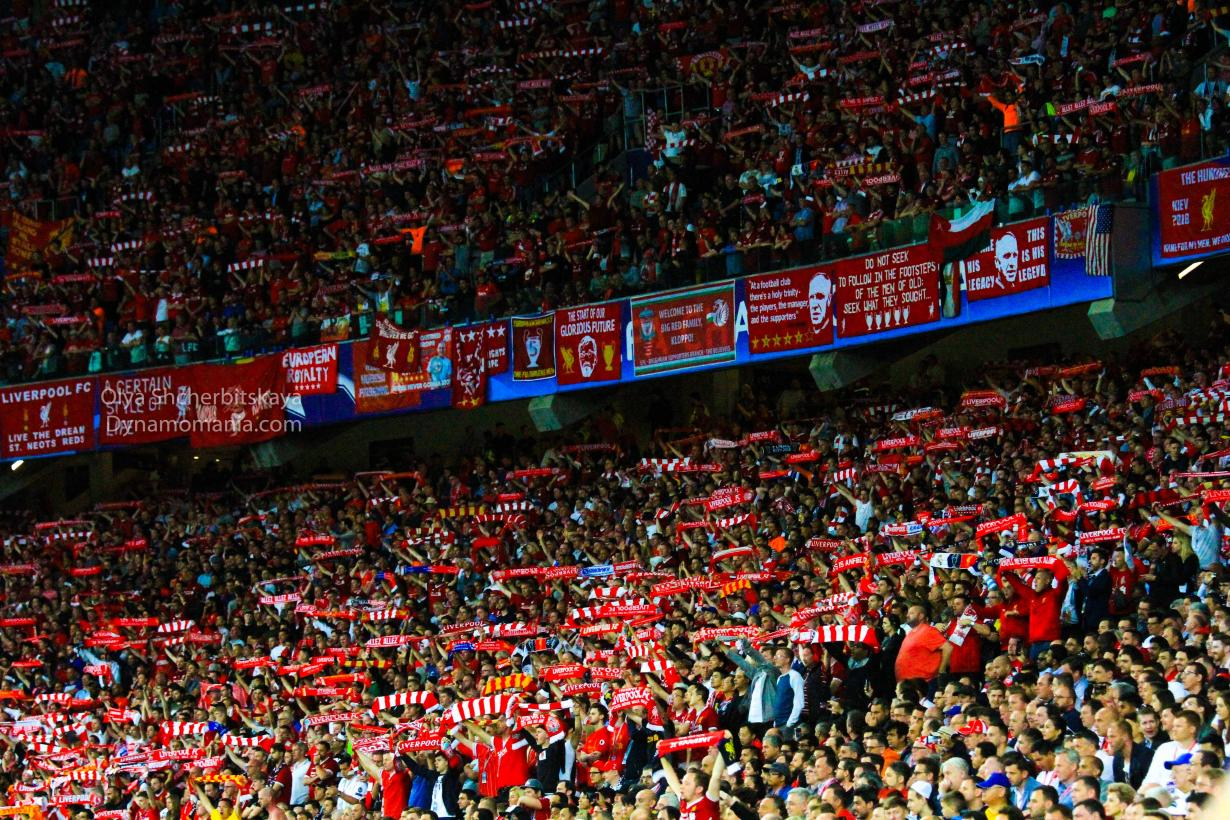
Shankly's 'holy trinity' quote appearing on a Liverpool banner (fifth from right) prior to the 2018 UEFA Champions League final

It is believed that Shankly wanted a seat on the Liverpool board, as Matt Busby had been given by Manchester United after he retired as their manager in 1969. Again, what Shankly did not understand was that his relations with the board had often been acrimonious with several resignation threats and a statement made by Shankly that:

At a football club, there's a holy trinity – the players, the manager and the supporters. Directors don't come into it. They are only there to sign the cheques.

Although some club officials like secretary Peter Robinson wanted bygones to be bygones, Tommy Smith summarised the board's view as one of satisfaction that Shankly had "gone at last". There was a perception that Shankly was an overbearing figure, who could use a position on the board to be a "backseat driver", and the board were well aware that Matt Busby's time as a Manchester United director had been disastrous. Busby's successors had complained about being undermined by his continued presence at United, who had been relegated in 1974. While Liverpool's treatment of Shankly may have seemed disrespectful, they were acting in the best interests of the club and its new manager by pursuing the same relentless winning ethic that Shankly himself had instilled. In any event, their perceived ruthlessness was vindicated by the unprecedented haul of League Championship titles and European Cups won over the next decade under Bob Paisley and Joe Fagan. After lifting the club's first European Cup under Paisley in Rome in 1977, captain Emlyn Hughes recalled:

I remember going over to Bob, giving him a hug and we both looked at each other and said 'Shanks', because Shanks had given us, given Bob, a chance to win that trophy.

Soon after Shankly's retirement, Brian Clough – who himself had recently been sacked by Leeds United – was asked during a David Frost interview whom in football management he respected, to which Clough replied: "Well, the guy who had my total respect finished a few months ago at Liverpool. He's a one off, there'll never be another one like Shanks. Never at all. He absolutely lives the game ... he was totally honest, he believed implicitly in what he was doing, and there was never, ever a doubt when you either talked to him, met him, or anything; he was above board. He was above board. He was one off."

== Later years ==
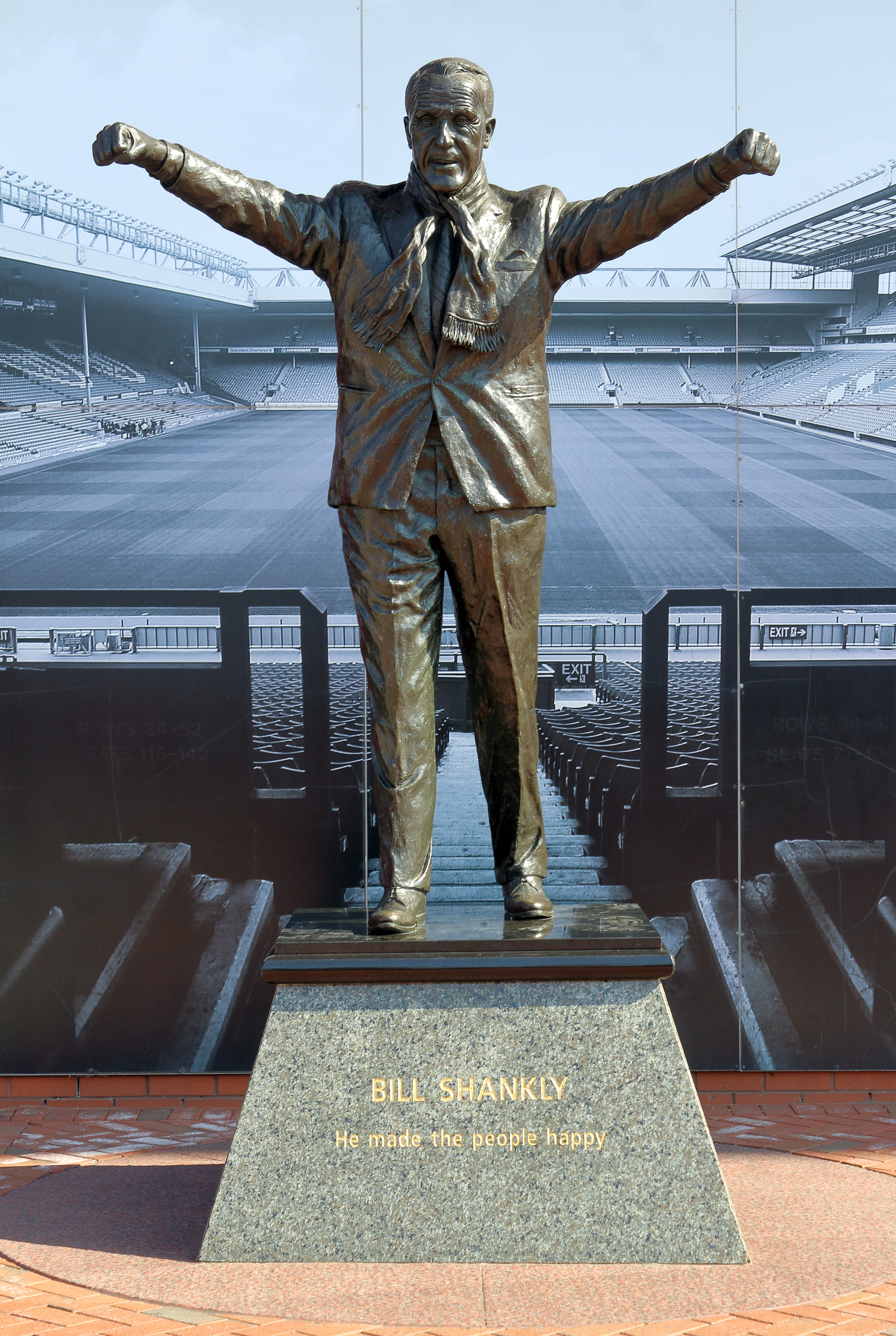
The statue of Shankly, erected in 1997, outside the Kop at Anfield

Shankly was awarded the OBE in November 1974, four months after he retired as Liverpool manager. He and Nessie went to Buckingham Palace and, according to Kelly, that was a rare day out for them. They continued to live in the semi-detached house at West Derby, near the Everton training ground at Bellefield, which they bought when they moved to Liverpool in 1959. After Shankly's death in 1981, Nessie lived there alone until she died in August 2002.

In realising he had made a mistake in retiring, he said "retire is a terrible, silly word. They should get a new word for it. The only time you retire is when you're in a box and the flowers come out." Shankly tried to keep busy and stay in touch with football. He worked for Radio City, a Liverpool station on which he presented his own chat show, once interviewing prime minister Harold Wilson, and was a pundit on its football coverage. He briefly took up advisory roles at Wrexham and then at Tranmere Rovers, helping former Liverpool captain Ron Yeats at the latter. In November 1976, the press speculated that Shankly would make a return to management as the successor to Dave Mackay at Derby County, but the position went to Colin Murphy instead. John Toshack recalled that Shankly was a great help to him when he went into management with Swansea City in 1978. Watching a Liverpool game at Anfield from the directors' box in 1980, he was approached there by Alex Ferguson and his assistant Archie Knox, who behaved "like a couple of groupies" according to Ferguson, with Shankly commenting, "so, you are down to have a look at our great team. Aye, they all try that", in response to their Aberdeen side preparing to face Liverpool in a European Cup game. Despite being in his sixties, Shankly kept himself fit and often took part in five-a-side football. If nothing else was available he would join teams of youngsters in kickabouts.

== Death and legacy ==
On the morning of 26 September 1981, Shankly was admitted to Broadgreen Hospital following a heart attack. His condition appeared to be stable and there was no suggestion that his life was in danger. On the following Monday morning, his condition suddenly deteriorated and he was transferred into intensive care. At 00:30 on 29 September, he suffered another cardiac arrest and was certified dead, aged 68, at 01:20. Supporters lined the streets of Liverpool on the day of his funeral, with many of his past players in attendance. He was cremated at the Anfield Crematorium on 2 October and his ashes were scattered on the Anfield pitch at the Kop end.

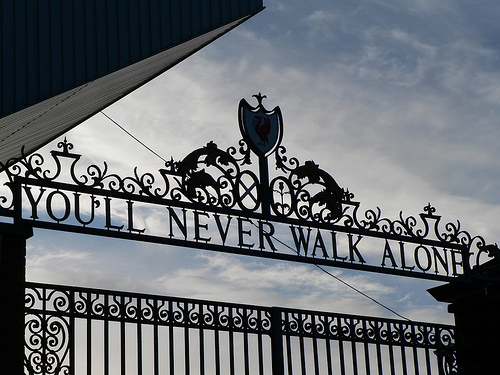
The Shankly Gates were erected outside Anfield in 1982

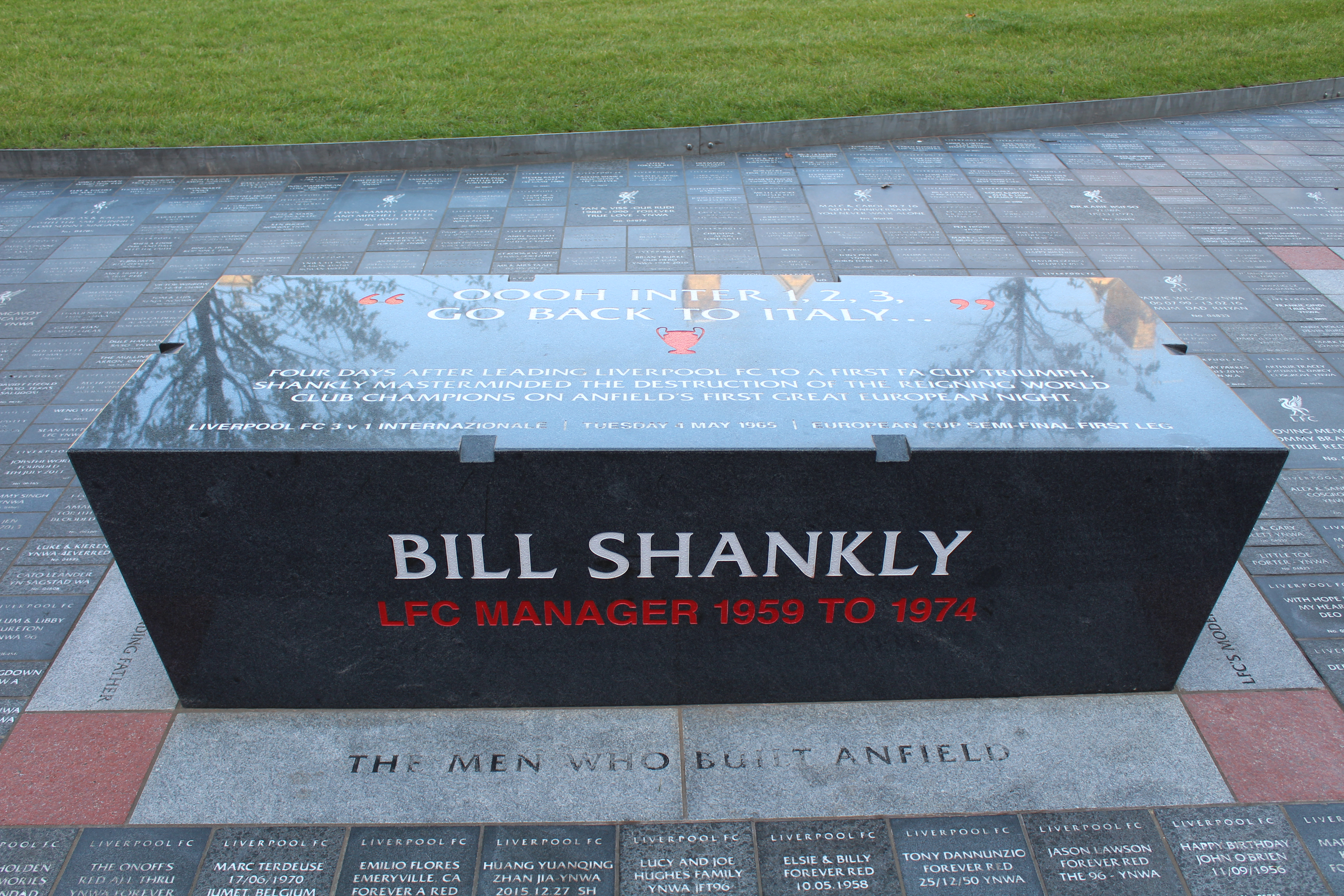
The Shankly plinth outside Anfield installed in 2016

On the day of Shankly's death, training was cancelled at both Melwood and Bellefield. The Labour Party conference stood in a minute's silence for a man who had always been a socialist. Sir Matt Busby, the former Manchester United manager, was so upset that he refused to take any telephone calls from people asking him for a reaction. Tributes poured in from the world of football, especially from the former players of all Shankly's clubs. Liverpool chairman John Smith summed them up with a simple but fitting: "In my opinion, he was the most outstanding and dynamic manager of the century". On 3 October, Liverpool's first home league game since his death, the Liverpool and Swansea players stood for a minute's silence, including former red John Toshack who unveiled a Liverpool shirt from under his Swansea tracksuit. A fan on the Kop held aloft a homemade banner with the words "Shankly Lives Forever".

Liverpool erected the 15-foot-high (4.6 m) cast iron Shankly Gates in front of the Anfield Road stand. Inscribed "You'll Never Walk Alone", they were opened by Nessie Shankly at a low-key ceremony in August 1982. In 1997, a seven-foot tall bronze statue of Shankly was unveiled outside the stadium. It bears the legend: "He made the people happy". In 2016, a plinth to Shankly was installed on 96 Avenue outside Anfield. The inscription features details of Liverpool's 1965 win over Inter Milan at Anfield, the club's first great European night.

From the mid-1990s, Preston North End started a rebuild of Deepdale to convert it into a modern all-seater stadium. When the former Spion Kop end was replaced by a new stand in 1998, it was named the Bill Shankly Kop and was designed with different coloured seats depicting an image of Shankly's head and shoulders. Shankly as a PNE player is referenced in Wallace & Gromit's Cracking Contraptions episode "The Soccamatic" in 2002.

Bill Shankly is arguably the most famous figure in Liverpool FC's illustrious history.

— Opening line of his profile in the Liverpool F.C. website.

Shankly was made an inaugural inductee of the English Football Hall of Fame in 2002, in recognition of his impact on the English game as a manager. In 2004, he was an inaugural inductee into the Scottish Football Hall of Fame. David Peace's biographical novel Red or Dead, published in 2013, is a fictionalised account of Shankly's career as Liverpool manager. The novel was short-listed for the inaugural Goldsmiths Prize (2013). A hotel and museum opened in Liverpool in August 2015 dedicated to the life and career of Shankly. Shankly also features in the popular Liverpool chant "Allez, Allez, Allez", which is frequently sung by Liverpool supporters, especially during European matches. Archived voice overs of Shankly ("My idea was to build Liverpool into a bastion of invincibility") appear on the track "Anfield Rap", a Liverpool FA Cup final song from 1988. His image and quotes feature in supporter's banners, and in the 2017 documentary, Shankly: Nature's Fire, former Liverpool captain Steven Gerrard stated "Bill Shankly is the iconic figure of Liverpool football club". His entry in FourFourTwo magazine's 2020 greatest managers list reads: "Shankly did more than build Liverpool; he formed a dynasty every bit as lasting as the city's other great team from that era – John, Paul, George and Ringo".

The club was unrecognisable from the decrepit, rundown place it had been on the eve of the 60s. Shankly found a team mired in the second tier of English football and propelled them to the continent's top table. He led the side to three titles, delivered their first FA Cup and their first European trophy, the Uefa Cup. Yet the silverware tells only a fraction of the story. The man from Glenbuck's biggest impact was metaphysical. He created the idea of Liverpool, something that did not exist before his arrival on Merseyside. That concept still runs through the club. Shankly made a point of emphasising the importance of fans. He talked about the Kop "sucking the ball into the net", and made spectators feel like participants in games. Shankly is the most significant icon in the club's history.

— Tony Evans, The Independent, December 2019. 'Bill Shankly remains the personification of Liverpool 60 years after he arrived on Merseyside'.

== Personal life ==
Shankly was married to his wife Agnes Wren-Fisher from 1944 until his death 37 years later. They had met earlier during World War II, when Bill was serving as a Corporal with the RAF and "Nessie", who was six years younger, was serving with the WRAF. They had two daughters. Nessie survived her husband by more than 20 years, dying in August 2002 at the age of 82. On Shankly's appointment as Liverpool manager in 1959, he and his family moved into a house in Bellefield Avenue, West Derby, Liverpool. Nessie Shankly was still living there at the time of her death more than 40 years later. Upon his death in 1981 Shankly left £99,077 in his will (equivalent to £381,951 in 2025). According to a BBC report in 1974, Shankly was teetotal.

== Personality ==
Bill Shankly was always more than a great football manager. He was football's Muhammad Ali: a charismatic maverick whose utterances had an unexpected, undeniable poetry. He led Liverpool like a revolutionary leader, casting his personnel not just as footballers but soldiers to his cause, and became a folk hero to the fans.

— James Corbett, The Guardian. October 2009.

Stephen Kelly, in his 1997 biography of Shankly, calls him "the ultimate obsessive". Shankly was fanatical about Liverpool and about football in general. From coaching his players and arguing with journalists to buttonholing fans in pubs, all Shankly ever wanted to do was talk about football and to be involved in football. As a result, he had few interests outside the game other than his family. His wife Nessie told Kelly that Shankly would spend time in the garden, mowing and weeding. She could rely on him to clean the cooker when Liverpool lost. Family holidays were limited to a week in Blackpool, where they always stayed at the Norbreck Hotel. One non-football activity that Shankly did enjoy was playing cards and Ian St John said he loved it, always taking part on long coach trips to away matches.

Video
- Shankly's remarks in the 1981 interview on YouTube

Video
- His 'life and death' quote also features in The Three Kings trailer on YouTube

Shankly was noted for his charismatic, outgoing personality and his wit; as a result, he is oft-quoted. His most famous quotation—'life and death'— is frequently paraphrased, and often appears in documentaries featuring him. In a May 1981 interview with Granada Television presenter Shelley Rohde, Shankly said that he had put his "heart and soul" into football "to the extent that [his] family suffered". When Rohde asked whether he regretted that devotion, he replied, "Yeah, I regret it very much", before adding:

Somebody said that football's a matter of life and death to you. I said, "Listen, it's more important than that."

Kelly wrote that, although it was said half-jokingly, so far as Shankly was concerned there was a degree of truth in what he had said. Shankly had fully realised the importance of football to its die-hard fans, himself included. It had become too important. Ian St John agreed that much of Shankly's behaviour was "bizarre", but everything was done with a purpose because Shankly always knew what he was doing and what he was saying. According to James Corbett in The Guardian: "he transformed Liverpool through sheer force of personality. As Keegan later said, he put "his character into the club in every facet from the bottom to the top". He instilled pride, discipline, loyalty and a relentless work ethic." Shankly was a father figure to many of his players, including Tommy Smith, the "Anfield Iron", who had lost his own father shortly before he signed as a 15-year-old, while John Toshack, in awe of his manager when meeting him as a 21-year-old, spoke on his impact on his players:

He inspired us in every way. His belief in Liverpool Football Club, the standards he set for himself and for the club, the intensity that he went about his job. His quote about football being more important than life or death, he really felt that way. He rammed it into us how important it was to be playing for Liverpool, how privileged we were to be playing for these people. We really believed that.

It's the greatest thing in the world, natural enthusiasm. You're nothing without it.

On how his tough, working class upbringing kept him grounded. "Pressure is working down the pit. Pressure is having no work at all. Pressure is trying to escape relegation on 50 shillings a week. Pressure is not the European Cup or the Championship or the Cup Final. That's the reward." On his belief in hard work, he referred to his time in the RAF: "If I had a job to do, even if it was scrubbing the floor, I wanted my floor to be cleaner than yours. Now if everyone thinks along these lines and does all the small jobs to the best of their ability – that's honesty, then the world would be better and football will be better. So, what I want is hard work. And no football club is successful without hard work."

In his autobiography, Shankly gave insights into his character such as his world-view as a socialist, explaining that the socialism he believed in was not about politics but about collectivism, with everyone working for each other and enjoying a share of the rewards. That was the basis of his approach to football which is a team game in which everyone works together and shares the rewards.

While he lived most of his life in the North of England, Shankly identified as a Scot, saying "If Scotland went to war tomorrow, I'll be the first one there." His advice to compatriot Ian St John having joined Liverpool: "Son, you'll do well here as long as you remember two things. Don't over-eat and don't lose your accent." He idolised Ayrshire poet and lyricist Robert Burns, whose birthplace was only 26 miles (42 km) from Glenbuck, and he was inspired by many of Burns' philosophical quotations, such as his egalitarian statement that "A Man's A Man for A' That". Shankly had no time for bigotry or prejudice, especially arising from differences of religion. He compared the cities of Glasgow and Liverpool by saying that there is nothing like the Rangers–Celtic situation in Liverpool because the supporters of Liverpool and Everton are a mixed bunch whose religion is football.

Shankly's public persona was that of a "tough guy" with the swagger of his favourite film star James Cagney but privately he was very different. Joe Mercer described his "heart of gold" and likened him to a Border Collie who drives his sheep but could never hurt them. Liverpool's perceived failings in the late 1960s have been attributed to Shankly's reluctance to drop his long-serving players even though they were past their best. Bob Paisley said it was Shankly's one failing and it was because he was "a softie at heart".

When asked by a TV interviewer how he would like to be remembered, Shankly replied:

Basically as an honest man in a game that is sometimes short on honesty. That I've been working honestly for the people of Liverpool to try and give them entertainment.

== Honours ==
=== As a player ===
Club / Team	Competition	Achievement	Year
Preston North End	FA Cup	Winners; runner-up: 1936–37	1937–38
Preston North End	Football League War Cup	Winners	1940–41
Preston North End	Football League Second Division	Promotion	1933–34
Scotland	British Home Championship	Winners	1938–39

=== As a manager ===
Club / Category	Competition / Award	Achievement	Year
Liverpool	Football League First Division	Winners	1963–64, 1965–66, 1972–73
Liverpool	Football League Second Division	Winners	1961–62
Liverpool	FA Cup	Winners	1964–65, 1973–74
Liverpool	FA Charity Shield	Winners	1964, 1965, 1966
Liverpool	UEFA Cup	Winners	1972–73

=== Individual ===
Award / Recognition	Year	Reference
Manager of the Year Award	1972–73	
Officer of the Order of the British Empire	1974	
PFA Merit Award	1978	
ESPN 10th Greatest Manager of All Time	2013	
France Football 10th Greatest Manager of All Time	2019	
World Soccer 20th Greatest Manager of All Time	2013	
FourFourTwo 4th Greatest Manager of All Time	2020	
Inaugural Inductee to the English Football Hall of Fame	2002	
Inaugural Inductee to the Scottish Football Hall of Fame	2004	

In April 2013, Shankly was honoured by Royal Mail in the United Kingdom, as one of ten people selected as subjects for the "Great Britons" commemorative postage stamp issue.

== Managerial statistics ==
Team	From	To	Record				
Team	From	To	G	W	D	L	Win %
Carlisle United	1949	1951	108	48	33	27	44.44
Grimsby Town	1951	1953	80	47	16	17	58.75
Workington	1954	1955	85	35	23	27	41.18
Huddersfield Town	1956	1959	134	49	35	50	36.57
Liverpool	1959	1974	783	407	198	178	51.98
Total			1,190	586	305	299	49.24

== See also ==
- List of English football championship winning managers
- List of longest managerial reigns in association football
- List of football managers with the most matches
