= Glenbuck Cherrypickers F.C. =

Former association football club in Scotland

Glenbuck Cherrypickers
- Full name: Glenbuck Cherrypickers Football Club
- Founded: 1870s (as Glenbuck Athletic)
- Dissolved: 1932
- Ground: Burnside Park; Glenbuck
- League: South Ayrshire Junior League; 1921–26, 1930–31
Home colours

Glenbuck Cherrypickers Football Club was a football team in the village of Glenbuck in Ayrshire, a district of Scotland.

The Glenbuck Cherrypickers were notable for the high number of professional footballers that they produced, despite only existing for around fifty years. Between their creation in the early 1870s, and their demise in 1931, the team produced some fifty professional footballers. This is despite their home – the mining village of Glenbuck – having a population of around 1,000.

== Club history ==
The club started its existence in the early 1870s as Glenbuck Athletic, founded by Edward and William Bone, with a strip of white jersey and black shorts. The name "Cherrypickers" is of obscure origin, beginning as a nickname in the first years of the 20th century, but may have derived from local men from Glenbuck or Muirkirk serving in the 11th Hussars (The "Cherry Pickers") in the Boer War. Another possible source was that almost all of the men associated with the club, players and officials, worked in the local pits where one of the jobs was sorting the good coal from stones and other material as it passed on a conveyor belt. The lumps of good coal had to be picked out and the workers who performed that task were known as cherry-pickers.

The club won the first three Ayrshire Junior Cup competitions in 1889–90, 1890–91 and 1891–92.

The club's last entire season was 1930–31, and it folded following the closure of the town's coal pit, which was almost the sole source of local employment. The town of Glenbuck itself was abandoned thereafter, and no longer exists.

== International honours ==
Seven players from Glenbuck were chosen to play at an international level for Scotland: Willie Muir (vs Ireland in 1907); Sandy Brown (vs England in 1902 and 1904); George Halley (Scottish League vs Football League in 1910); Johnny Crosbie (vs Wales in 1920 and England in 1922); Bob Shankly (vs Republic of Ireland in 1938); Bill Shankly (capped thirteen times between 1938 and 1943). Alex McConnell was selected in a squad in 1897 to play against England, but signed for an English team, Everton, two days later; at the time, this made him ineligible to represent Scotland.

== Notable players ==
The club is associated with Bill Shankly, although it closed before he played a game for the Cherrypickers' 1st XI. Shankly went on to captain Scotland in 1942, and is best known as the manager of Liverpool. All four of Shankly's older brothers appeared for Glenbuck, and each went on to play professional football in Scotland or England. One, Bob Shankly, also managed at a professional level at several clubs, including Dundee, whom he took to the semi-finals of the European Cup in 1962–63.

Sandy Tait and Sandy Brown both played for Glenbuck before going on to play for Tottenham Hotspur, with whom they won the English FA Cup in 1901.

The five Knox brothers – Hugh, Alec, Tom, William and Peter – played together extremely successfully as a team in five-a-side tournaments. Their most successful season saw them win all but one of the 41 tournaments that they entered. The usual prize in these tournaments was a barometer or a clock, and they amassed so many that they would often simply hand them to friends on the touchline as gifts rather than carry them home.

Bob Blyth, uncle to the Shankly brothers played for Rangers, Preston North End and Portsmouth, before becoming manager of Portsmouth in 1901, guiding them to the 1901–02 Southern League title.

== Sources ==
- Scottish Football Historical Archive
