= Glenbuck =

Coordinates: 55°32′11″N 3°58′38″W

Glenbuck: Scottish Gaelic: Gleann Buic
- Location within East Ayrshire
- OS grid reference: NS753287
- Council area: East Ayrshire
- Lieutenancy area: Ayrshire and Arran
- Country: Scotland
- Sovereign state: United Kingdom
- Post town: CUMNOCK
- Postcode district: KA18
- Police: Scotland
- Fire: Scottish
- Ambulance: Scottish
- UK Parliament: Kilmarnock and Loudoun
- Scottish Parliament: Carrick, Cumnock and Doon Valley

Glenbuck (Scottish Gaelic: Gleann Buic) is a small, remote village in East Ayrshire. It is nestled in the hills 3 miles (5 km) east of Muirkirk, East Ayrshire, Scotland.

== Glenbuck Loch ==
The site of the village was slightly to the north-west of Glenbuck "Loch", on the River Ayr, and was surrounded on three sides by South Lanarkshire. The Ayrshire/Lanarkshire border runs north to south across the Loch. The "Loch" is in fact a dam created in 1802 by James Finlay for his Catrine cotton works. Much of the dam banks was created by French prisoners of war. The dam was situated so that the water to power the mill took exactly 12 hours to reach Catrine. The Tenant of West Glenbuck Farm had his rent paid by James Findlay to open the sluice at 18.00 and close it at 06.00, mirroring exactly the working hours of the Mill. The water turned the famous Catrine Wheel which powered the Mill. The double wheel was 15.24 metres (50 ft) in diameter and revolved three times per minute, using 240 tonnes (236 long tons; 265 short tons) of water whilst generating 500 horsepower (370 kW). The water also powered a dozen other water mills downstream. The dam's creation largely drained the valley downstream and thus allowed the road to be relocated into the valley floor along the route of the modern A70 and paved the way for the adjacent railway line around 1839. Previously the land was a dense bog with the old coach road higher up on the opposite side of valley running below Wee Darnhunch then west across the fields along to Darnhunch Farm where gaps in the stone walls (dykes) shows the old Toll Route.

Railway enthusiasts considered the loch - bisected by the 1830 line - to be an exceptional place to photograph trains with still-water either side of the line and many photos, well known to steam buffs, exist. The last local train through Glenbuck station and over this dam was in 1964. The first steam railway in Scotland was between Troon and Kilmarnock, and its iron rails were made in Glenbuck Iron works.

== Economy ==
Glenbuck was once a thriving coal mining community, but the last mine closed in 1931. The village was unable to provide jobs for the unemployed miners and suffered economic decline as a result.

It was also an early centre for making pig iron and early coal blast furnaces were built and remained till recently. Used from 1795 to 1813 these belonged to the Glenbuck Iron Co. whose papers are lodged with the Scottish Records office. Local lore says the firm conducted early research (pre-Coalbrookdale) to make steel from coal with supposed advice provided by experts from Toledo. A deep study of local iron work was published by Donnachie and Butt, I L & J (1965) 'Three 18th century Scottish ironworks'.

Weaving was also common and 'Stair Row' in Glenbuck was the street where the weavers lived and worked. The last traditional weaver died in 1880 ('Cairntable Echoes'- 2002 p 122).

== Glenbuck House ==
In 1879, local mine owner Charles Howatson built a splendid high Victorian estate house known as Glenbuck House and he forested all around the loch. He was in his middle years when he built and developed the estate with fine and still extant steadings. He died in 1914, and in the following decades his inheritors, in order to avoid paying tax on the family home, eventually removed the roof (after 1945?) and the house soon crumbled as the softer red local Mauchline sandstone is highly friable when exposed to rain. The once fine house was built and turned to dust in less than a century, and was ultimately demolished by 1948 after a brief plan to turn it into flats was abandoned by Ayr County Council. The loch car park now occupies its site.

== Sporting connections ==
- The village is best known for being the birthplace of Bill Shankly, who played football for Preston North End and Scotland before going on to manage Liverpool. Shankly was born in the village in 1913 and there is a memorial to him at Glenbuck Heritage Village.
- Glenbuck Cherrypickers, the town's obscurely named football team, was also successful, producing a steady stream of professional footballers (53 in total). The team folded in 1931 before Shankly was old enough to play for them, although all 4 of his brothers did. The site of the village pitch remains. This seminal football team's story appears frequently in the press.

== Status today ==
Little of the original village exists. Opencast coal mining in the 1990s resulted in the demolition of many original properties (The School, Kirk, Mitchell's Coal Yard, Hillside market gardens, two blocks of council houses, various outlying farms Airdsgreen, Grashill. etc. Spireslack farmhouse remains but surrounded on all sides by open-cast mining). Of the seven remaining houses still extant, four are still occupied including a taxi firm and artist's (see links). A wind farm developer administers most of the properties but since taking control (Nov 1st 2010) West Glenbuck farmhouse has lain empty, leading to further de-population of the village. Lochside Cottage, now in private ownership, was the 'new' toll house and Wee Darnhunch was the old toll house for the earlier higher road which was manned by Robert Burns's maternal uncle - John Brown - in the 1790s.

Glenbuck, at the head of the River Ayr, is mentioned in Robert Burns's poem The Brigs of Ayr describing the River Ayr - Auld Ayr - in winter flood threatening the New Brig:

Aroused by blustering winds an' spotting thowes,
In mony a torrent down the snaw-broo rowes;
While crashing ice, borne on the rolling spate,
Sweeps dams, an' mills, an' brigs, a' to the gate;
And from Glenbuck, down to the Ratton-key,
Auld Ayr is just one lengthen'd, tumbling sea-

— The Auld Brig predicting the destruction of the New Brig, in Robert Burns, "The Brigs of Ayr", lines 119-124

West Glenbuck Farm land is where one of the best examples of a flanged Bronze Axe head in Scotland was found when ploughing - this item is held by the National Museum in Edinburgh and a picture is printed in the Society Of Antiquaries of Scotland notes by Arch. Fairbairn 1913–27. The C38 road is still maintained by the council and the Shankly memorial is often visited along with a new River Ayr Way walk which loosely follows the 44-mile (71 km) length of the river to the coast. The innovative river walk begins at a totem pole, inscribed with "Muirkirk", located near the loch. There is also a permanent bird-hide on the loch to observe local waterfowl. A useful local collection of Muirkirk Advertiser items provides much historic data and articles along with births, deaths and marriages for Glenbuck. It is available in the village directly from the publisher and via East Ayrshire Council library services in Muirkirk.

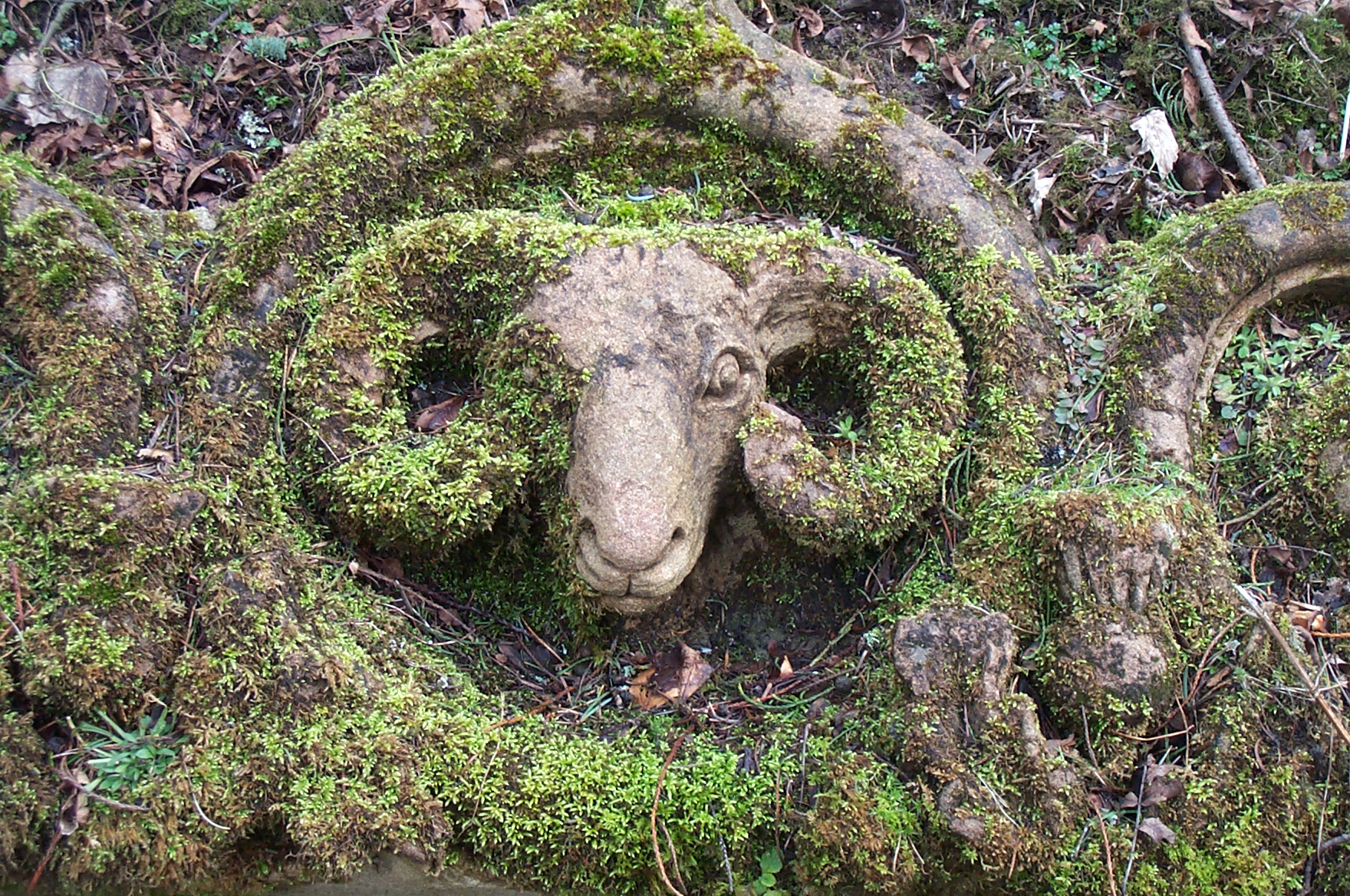
Glenbuck Lodge door ornament

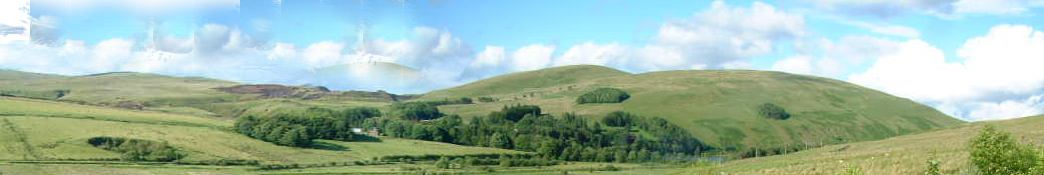
Glenbuck area before opencast mining arrived in the late 1990s
