= 2026–27 Portsmouth F.C. season =

English football club season

Portsmouth
2026–27 season
- Owner-Chairman: Michael Eisner
- Chief Executive Officer: Andrew Cullen
- Head Coach: John Mousinho
- Stadium: Fratton Park
- EFL Championship: 10th (22 pts)
- FA Cup: Third round
- EFL Cup: First round
- Top goalscorer: League: Terry Devlin (4); All: Terry Devlin (4)
- Highest home attendance: 20,479 vs. Q.P.R. (15 August 2026)
- Biggest win: 1-3 vs. Lincoln City (22 August 2026)
- Biggest defeat: 1-3 vs. Q.P.R. (15 August 2026)
Home colours	Away colours	Third colours

The 2026–27 season is the third consecutive season of Portsmouth Football Club in the EFL Championship since their promotion in 2024. In addition to the domestic league, the club would also participate in the FA Cup, and the EFL Cup.

Portsmouth were knocked out of the EFL Cup in the First Round on 8 August 2026 away to West Ham United after a 3–1 defeat.

== Players ==
=== Squad ===
As of 3 September 2026

Note: Flags indicate national team as defined under FIFA eligibility rules; some limited exceptions apply. Players may hold more than one non-FIFA nationality.

No.	Pos.	Nation	Player
1	GK	AUT	Nicolas Schmid
2	DF	ENG	Benjamin Arthur (on loan from Brentford)
3	DF	ENG	Connor Ogilvie
5	DF	WAL	Regan Poole
6	DF	IRL	Conor Shaughnessy
7	MF	ENG	Marlon Pack (captain)
8	MF	ENG	John Swift
9	FW	ENG	Colby Bishop
10	FW	CRO	Adrian Segečić
11	FW	ENG	Abu Kamara
15	FW	IRL	Franco Umeh
16	DF	ENG	Jayden Meghoma (on loan from Brentford)
17	FW	SKN	Tyrese Shade
18	MF	HUN	Márk Kosznovszky
19	MF	EST	Rocco Shein
20	FW	AUS	Thomas Waddingham
21	FW	ENG	Keshi Anderson
22	DF	ENG	Zak Swanson

No.	Pos.	Nation	Player
23	FW	ENG	Josh Murphy
24	DF	NIR	Terry Devlin
25	FW	ENG	Ryan Kavuma-McQueen (on loan from Chelsea)
27	MF	ENG	Odin Bailey
28	FW	NZL	Luke Brooke-Smith
29	FW	SRB	Marko Milovanović
30	GK	ENG	Ben Killip
31	GK	POL	Daniel Bielica
32	FW	NIR	Eoin Kenny
33	DF	AUS	Jacob Farrell
34	FW	ENG	Harvey Blair
37	MF	COM	Iyad Mohamed
38	MF	GAM	Ebou Adams
45	MF	ENG	Chinedu Agu
48	FW	ENG	Nathaniel Chioma
49	DF	ENG	Michael Ani
55	DF	SEN	Madiodio Dia

== Transfers ==
=== In ===
No.	Pos.	Player	Transferred From	Fee	Date	Source
27	MF	(England) Odin Bailey	(England) Stockport County	Free transfer	1 July 2026	
32	FW	(Northern Ireland) Eoin Kenny	(Republic of Ireland) Dundalk	£34,000	6 July 2026	
19	MF	(Estonia) Rocco Shein	(Norway) Fredrikstad	£2,100,000	13 July 2026	
29	FW	(Serbia) Marko Milovanović	(Spain) Almería	£3,000,000 (Note: A potential further £1,250,000 in add-ons)	23 July 2026	
31	GK	(Poland) Daniel Bielica	(Netherlands) NAC Breda	£520,000	24 July 2026	
28	FW	(New Zealand) Luke Brooke-Smith	(New Zealand) Wellington Phoenix	£400,000	28 July 2026	
11	FW	(England) Abu Kamara	(England) Hull City	£2,500,000	10 August 2026	
37	MF	(Comoros) Iyad Mohamed	(Portugal) Casa Pia	Undisclosed	27 August 2026	
17	FW	(Saint Kitts and Nevis) Tyrese Shade	(England) Burton Albion	£1,800,000 (Note: A potential further £400,000 in add-ons.)	1 September 2026	

=== Out ===
No.	Pos.	Player	Transferred to	Fee	Date	Source
21	MF	(England) Andre Dozzell	(United States) DC United	End of Contract	30 June 2025	
28	MF	(England) Reuben Swann	(England) Braintree Town	End of Contract	30 June 2025	
31	GK	(Scotland) Jordan Archer	Unattached	End of Contract	30 June 2025	
-	MF	(England) Harry Clout	Unattached	End of Contract	30 June 2025	
17	DF	(Scotland) Ibane Bowat	(England) Huddersfield Town	Undisclosed	5 August 2026	
16	MF	(South Africa) Luke Le Roux	Unattached	Mutual Consent	3 September 2026	

=== Loaned in ===
No.	Pos.	Player	Loaned From	Until	Date	Source
2	DF	(England) Benjamin Arthur	(England) Brentford	End of Season	12 August 2026	
25	FW	(England) Ryan Kavuma-McQueen	(England) Chelsea	End of Season	14 August 2026	
16	DF	(England) Jayden Meghoma	(England) Brentford	End of Season	1 September 2026	

=== Loaned out ===
No.	Pos.	Player	Loaned to	Loaned until	Date	Source
-	GK	(England) Toby Steward	(Scotland) St Johnstone	End of Season	7 July 2026	
25	FW	(Northern Ireland) Makenzie Kirk	(England) Barnsley	End of Season	16 July 2026	
2	DF	(England) Jordan Williams	(England) Blackpool	End of Season	29 July 2026	
4	DF	(England) Josh Knight	(England) Reading	End of Season	28 August 2026	
14	DF	(Australia) Hayden Matthews	(England) Bradford City	End of Season	31 August 2026	
26	GK	(England) Josef Bursik	(England) AFC Wimbledon	End of Season	1 September 2026	
46	FW	(England) Tayo Singerr	(England) AFC Totton	End of Season	8 September 2026	
33	DF	(Australia) Jacob Farrell	(Australia) Sydney FC	End of Season	16 September 2026	

== Pre-season and friendlies ==
On 8 June, Pompey announced three pre-season friendlies - against Woking, Aldershot Town and Farnborough. Two days later, a fourth away trip was confirmed against Wycombe Wanderers. A trip to Germany to take on Darmstadt was next to be added to the schedule. On 22 June, a visit to Bristol Rovers was confirmed.

Win Draw Loss Fixtures

14 July 2026 Friendly	Woking	1–2	Portsmouth	Woking
19:00 BST	Sohna 37'	Report	Bishop 28'; Waddingham 55'	Stadium: Kingfield Stadium; Attendance: 1,012 (275 away); Referee: Charles Breakspear

15 July 2026 Friendly	Aldershot Town	2–0	Portsmouth	Aldershot
17:00 BST	Sandah 32'; Dinanga 34'	Report		Stadium: Recreation Ground; Attendance: 1,030; Referee: Kai Morgan
Note: Fixture was initially scheduled for a 19:00 kick-off, but was brought forward two hours as to not clash with England in 2026 FIFA World Cup involvements.

18 July 2026 Friendly	Bristol Rovers	1–1	Portsmouth	Horfield
15:00 BST	Cavegn 57'	Report	Downey 77'	Stadium: Memorial Stadium; Attendance: 2,064 (574 away); Referee: Sunny Gill

25 July 2026 Friendly	Wycombe Wanderers	3–1	Portsmouth	High Wycombe
16:00 BST	Henderson 2'; Woodrow 46'; Olabiyi 73'	Report	Waddingham 90'	Stadium: Adams Park; Attendance: 1,820 (578 away); Referee: Stephen Parkinson

29 July 2026 Friendly	Farnborough	1–1	Portsmouth	Farnborough
19:00 BST	Bloomfield 66'	Report	Sylvanus 21'	Stadium: Saunders Transport Community Stadium; Attendance: 1,178; Referee: Tom Berry

1 August 2026 Friendly	Darmstadt 98	0–0	Portsmouth	Darmstadt, Germany
14:00 CEST		Report	Shaughnessy (yellow card) 75'	Stadium: Merck-Stadion am Böllenfalltor; Attendance: 6,325 (1,433 away); Referee: Felix Prigan

5 August 2026 Friendly	Portsmouth	2–0	Kuwait SC	Hilsea
13:00 CEST	Sylvanus; Chioma	Report		Stadium: 442 Copnor Road Training Ground, Hilsea; Attendance: 0 (BCD)

== Competitions ==
=== Overall record ===
Competition	First match	Last match	Starting round	Final position	Record							
Competition	First match	Last match	Starting round	Final position	Pld	W	D	L	GF	GA	GD	Win %
EFL Championship	15 August 2026	1 May 2027	Matchday 1	TBD	15	6	4	5	20	18	+2	40.00
FA Cup	January 2027	TBD	Third Round	TBD	0	0	0	0	0	0	+0	—
EFL Cup	8 August 2026	8 August 2026	First Round	First Round	1	0	0	1	1	3	−2	0.00
Total					16	6	4	6	21	21	+0	37.50

Last updated: 24 October 2026
Source: Soccerway

=== EFL Championship ===
==== League table ====
Pos	Team	Pld	W	D	L	GF	GA	GD	Pts
9	West Ham United	15	6	5	4	37	23	+14	23
10	Sheffield United	15	6	4	5	21	19	+2	22
11	Portsmouth	15	6	4	5	20	18	+2	22
12	Norwich City	15	7	0	8	32	24	+8	21
13	Blackburn Rovers	15	6	3	6	22	23	−1	21

Updated to match(es) played on 7 November 2026. Source: EFL Official Website
Rules for classification: 1) Points; 2) Goal difference; 3) Number of goals scored; 4) Head-to-head results; 5) Wins; 6) Away goals; 7) Penalty points (sec 9.5); 8) Number of 12-point sending off offences; 9) Play-off (only if needed to determine promotion/relegation)

==== League results summary ====
Overall								Home						Away					
Pld	W	D	L	GF	GA	GD	Pts	W	D	L	GF	GA	GD	W	D	L	GF	GA	GD
15	6	4	5	20	18	+2	22	4	1	3	14	13	+1	2	3	2	6	5	+1

Last updated: 7 November 2026.
Source: Soccerway

==== League results by round ====
Round	1	2	3	4	5	7	8	9	10	11	6^{1}	12	13	14	15	16	17	18	19	20	21	22	23	24	25	26	27	28	29	30	31	32	33	34	35	36	37	38	39	40	41	42	43	44	45	46
Ground	H	A	A	H	H	A	H	A	H	A	A	H	A	H	H	A	H	A	H	A	H	A	H	A	A	H	H	A	A	H	H	A	A	H	H	A	H	A	A	H	H	A	H	A	H	A
Result	L	W	L	L	W	D	D	L	W	W	D	W	D	W	L																															
Position	22	10	15	21	14	18	18	19	16	13	13	11	11	10	11																															
Points	0	3	3	3	6	7	8	8	11	14	15	18	19	22	22																															

Source: Soccerway
A = Away; H = Home; W = Win; D = Draw; L = Loss; P = Postponed; AB = Abandoned
Notes:
- ^{1} Matchday 6 (vs Wolverhampton Wanderers) was rescheduled due to opposition in EFL Cup involvements.

==== League matches ====
On 25 June, the Championship fixtures were revealed.

Win Draw Loss Fixtures

15 August 2026 1	Portsmouth	1–3	Queens Park Rangers	Portsmouth
15:00 BST	Devlin 15'	Report	Chair 33', 45+2'; Edwards (yellow card) 25'; Saitō 40'	Stadium: Fratton Park; Attendance: 20,479 (2,197 away); Referee: Will Finnie

22 August 2026 2	Lincoln City	1–3	Portsmouth	Lincoln
12:30 BST	Hackett-Fairchild 32' (pen.); Draper (yellow card) 34'; Bayliss (yellow card) 68'; Hamer (yellow card) 71'	Report	Kavuma-McQueen 7'; Segečić 16'; Shein (yellow card) 55'; Adams 69'	Stadium: Sincil Bank; Attendance: 10,545 (1,178 away); Referee: Tony Harrington
Note: Fixture was initially scheduled for a 15:00 kick-off, but was moved for live Sky Sports broadcast.

29 August 2026 3	Bristol City	2–1	Portsmouth	Bristol
15:00 BST	Tolaj 31'; Cardines (yellow card) 49'; Knight 56', (yellow card) 67'; Dickie (yellow card) 77'	Report	Milovanović 90+5' (pen.)	Stadium: Ashton Gate; Attendance: 24,134 (2,791 away); Referee: James Bell

1 September 2026 4	Portsmouth	0–2	Derby County	Portsmouth
19:45 BST	Devlin (yellow card) 69'	Report	Szmodics 16'; Langås (yellow card) 51'; Salvesen 62'; Taylor (yellow card) 83'	Stadium: Fratton Park; Attendance: 20,282 (1,567 away); Referee: Samuel Allison

5 September 2026 5	Portsmouth	2–0	Cardiff City	Portsmouth
15:00 BST	Shaughnessy 31'; Milovanović 52'	Report	Bielik (yellow card) 9'; Tanner (yellow card) 60'; Robertson (yellow card) 86'; Salech (yellow card) 90+2'	Stadium: Fratton Park; Attendance: 20,459 (2,184 away); Referee: Ben Speedie

12 September 2026 7	Charlton Athletic	0–0	Portsmouth	Charlton
15:00 BST	Leaburn (yellow card) 86'	Report	Adams (yellow card) 86'	Stadium: The Valley; Attendance: 18,836 (3,052 away); Referee: Andrew Kitchen

19 September 2026 8	Portsmouth	2–2	Blackburn Rovers	Portsmouth
15:00 BST	Swanson 4', (yellow card) 89'; Pack (yellow card) 40'; Bishop 74'	Report	Afolayan 11'; Atcheson (yellow card) 47'; Morishita 56'	Stadium: Fratton Park; Attendance: 20,244 (794 away); Referee: John Busby

11 October 2026 9	Southampton	1–0	Portsmouth	Southampton
12:00 BST	Bree 20'; Bragg (yellow card) 32' (yellow-red card) 44'; Larin (yellow card) 51'; Azaz (yellow card) 53'; Schlotterbeck (yellow card) 82'	Report	Adams (yellow card) 34'; Meghoma (yellow card) 53'; Devlin (yellow card) 69'	Stadium: St Mary's Stadium; Attendance: 30,735 (2,500 Pompey fans); Referee: Adam Herczeg
Note: Fixture was initially scheduled for 10 October, but was rescheduled for a day later.

14 October 2026 10	Portsmouth	3–2	Sheffield United	Portsmouth
19:45 BST	Meghoma (yellow card) 27'; Swanson 41'; Segečić 54'; Schmid (yellow card) 60'; Adams (yellow card) 82', (goal) 89'		Choudhury (yellow card) 35' (red card) 44'; Tanganga 59'; McCallum (yellow card) 60'; Cannon 67'	Stadium: Fratton Park; Attendance: 18,446; Referee: Oliver Langford

17 October 2026 11	Norwich City	0–1	Portsmouth	Norwich
15:00 BST	Schwartau (yellow card) 66'; Kvistgaarden (yellow card) 90'; Yongwa (yellow card) 90+3'		Milovanović 51' (pen.), (yellow card) 55'; Kavuma-McQueen (yellow card) 64'	Stadium: Carrow Road; Attendance: 25,790; Referee: Gavin Ward

20 October 2026 6	Wolverhampton Wanderers	1–1	Portsmouth	Wolverhampton
19:45 BST	Neave (yellow card) 22'; James 62'; Bellegarde (yellow card) 83'; Doyle (yellow card) 84'	Report	Mohamed (yellow card) 55'; Milovanović (yellow card) 80'; Devlin 86'; Kavuma-McQueen (yellow card) 90+5'	Stadium: Molineux Stadium; Attendance: 29,058; Referee: Edward Duckworth
Note: Fixture was initially scheduled for 9 September, but was pushed back a week due to Wolverhampton Wanderers' EFL Cup involvements. It was then rearranged again until later-October.

24 October 2026 12	Portsmouth	2–1	Millwall	Portsmouth
12:30 BST	Dykes 16' (o.g.); Milovanović (yellow card) 71'; Waddingham 82'; Swanson (yellow card) 90+4'	Report	Metcalfe 6'; Crama (yellow card) 24'; Cooper (yellow card) 45'	Stadium: Fratton Park; Attendance: 20,476; Referee: Tom Reeves
Note: Fixture was initially scheduled for a 15:00 kick-off, but was brought forward for live Sky Sports broadcasting.

31 October 2026 13	Burnley	0–0	Portsmouth	Burnley
15:00 GMT	Laurent (yellow card) 39'	Report	Meghoma (yellow card) 39'	Stadium: Turf Moor; Attendance: 18,811; Referee: Ruebyn Ricardo

3 November 2026 14	Portsmouth	3–1	Swansea City	Portsmouth
19:45 GMT	Adams (yellow card) 21'; Devlin 36', 90+2'; Poole (yellow card) 83'; Waddingham 90+8'	Report	Vipotnik 85' (pen.)	Stadium: Fratton Park; Attendance: 18,897; Referee: Matthew Corlett

7 November 2026 15	Portsmouth	1–2	Stoke City	Portsmouth
12:30 GMT	Shade 6'; Adams (yellow card) 22'; Poole (yellow card) 45+1'; Devlin (yellow card) 90+4'	Report	Tchamadeu (yellow card) 29'; Boženík (yellow card) 55'; McGlynn 59'; Galbraith (yellow card) 72'; Wilmot 77'	Stadium: Fratton Park; Attendance: 20,306; Referee: Ben Speedie
Note: Fixture was initially scheduled for a 15:00 kick-off, but was brought forward for live Sky Sports broadcasting.

21 November 2026 16	Bolton Wanderers	v	Portsmouth	Bolton
15:00 GMT				Stadium: Toughsheet Community Stadium

24 November 2026 17	Portsmouth	v	West Ham United	Portsmouth
19:45 GMT				Stadium: Fratton Park

28 November 2026 18	Wrexham	v	Portsmouth	Wrexham
15:00 GMT				Stadium: Racecourse Ground

5 December 2026 19	Portsmouth	v	West Bromwich Albion	Portsmouth
15:00 GMT				Stadium: Fratton Park

9 December 2026 20	Preston North End	v	Portsmouth	Preston
19:45 GMT				Stadium: Deepdale

12 December 2026 21	Portsmouth	v	Birmingham City	Portsmouth
15:00 GMT				Stadium: Fratton Park

19 December 2026 22	Middlesbrough	v	Portsmouth	Middlesbrough
15:00 GMT				Stadium: Riverside Stadium

26 December 2026 23	Portsmouth	v	Watford	Portsmouth
15:00 GMT				Stadium: Fratton Park

29 December 2026 24	Millwall	v	Portsmouth	Bermondsey
19:45 GMT				Stadium: The Den

1 January 2027 25	Birmingham City	v	Portsmouth	Birmingham
15:00 GMT				Stadium: St Andrew's

16 January 2027 26	Portsmouth	v	Norwich City	Portsmouth
15:00 GMT				Stadium: Fratton Park

23 January 2027 27	Portsmouth	v	Burnley	Portsmouth
15:00 GMT				Stadium: Fratton Park

27 January 2027 28	Swansea City	v	Portsmouth	Swansea
20:00 GMT				Stadium: Swansea.com Stadium
Note: Fixture was initially scheduled for a 19:45 kick-off, but was pushed back fifteen minutes for live Sky Sports broadcasting.

30 January 2027 29	Stoke City	v	Portsmouth	Stoke-on-Trent
15:00 GMT				Stadium: Bet365 Stadium

6 February 2027 30	Portsmouth	v	Bolton Wanderers	Portsmouth
15:00 GMT				Stadium: Fratton Park

13 February 2027 31	Portsmouth	v	Charlton Athletic	Portsmouth
12:30 GMT				Stadium: Fratton Park
Note: Fixture was initially scheduled for a 15:00 kick-off, but was brought forward for live Sky Sports broadcasting.

16 February 2027 32	Sheffield United	v	Portsmouth	Sheffield
19:45 GMT				Stadium: Bramall Lane

20 February 2027 33	Blackburn Rovers	v	Portsmouth	Blackburn
15:00 GMT				Stadium: Ewood Park

28 February 2027 34	Portsmouth	v	Southampton	Portsmouth
12:00 GMT				Stadium: Fratton Park
Note: Fixture was initially scheduled for 27 February, but was rescheduled for a day later.

3 March 2027 35	Portsmouth	v	Lincoln City	Portsmouth
20:00 GMT				Stadium: Fratton Park
Note: Fixture was initially scheduled for a 19:45 kick-off, but was pushed back fifteen minutes for live Sky Sports broadcasting.

6 March 2027 36	Queens Park Rangers	v	Portsmouth	Shepherd's Bush
15:00 GMT				Stadium: Loftus Road

13 March 2027 37	Portsmouth	v	Wrexham	Portsmouth
15:00 GMT				Stadium: Fratton Park

16 March 2027 38	West Bromwich Albion	v	Portsmouth	West Bromwich
19:45 GMT				Stadium: The Hawthorns

20 March 2027 39	Watford	v	Portsmouth	Watford
15:00 GMT				Stadium: Vicarage Road

3 April 2027 40	Portsmouth	v	Middlesbrough	Portsmouth
15:00 BST				Stadium: Fratton Park

6 April 2027 41	Portsmouth	v	Wolverhampton Wanderers	Portsmouth
19:45 BST				Stadium: Fratton Park

10 April 2027 42	Cardiff City	v	Portsmouth	Cardiff
15:00 BST				Stadium: Cardiff City Stadium

17 April 2027 43	Portsmouth	v	Bristol City	Portsmouth
15:00 BST				Stadium: Fratton Park

20 April 2027 44	Derby County	v	Portsmouth	Derby
19:45 BST				Stadium: Pride Park Stadium

24 April 2027 45	Portsmouth	v	Preston North End	Portsmouth
15:00 BST				Stadium: Fratton Park

1 May 2027 46	West Ham United	v	Portsmouth	Stratford
12:30 BST				Stadium: London Stadium

=== FA Cup ===
As a Championship side, Portsmouth enter the competition in the third round.

Win Draw Loss Fixtures

=== EFL Cup ===
Pompey were drawn away to West Ham United on 8 August 2026, losing 3-1 and were knocked out of the competition in the First Round.

Win Draw Loss Fixtures

8 August 2026 First round	West Ham United	3–1	Portsmouth	Stratford
15:00 BST	Castellanos 43', 50'; Bowen 45'; Álvarez (yellow card) 54'	Report	Segečić 33', (yellow card) 86'; Adams (yellow card) 88'	Stadium: London Stadium; Attendance: 53,369 (9,000 away); Referee: Adam Herczeg

== Statistics ==
=== Appearances and goals ===
As of match played 7 November 2026

Players with no appearances are not included on the list.
Loaned players in italics

No.	Pos	Nat	Player	Total		Championship		FA Cup		EFL Cup	
No.	Pos	Nat	Player	Apps	Goals	Apps	Goals	Apps	Goals	Apps	Goals
1	GK	(Austria) AUT	Nicolas Schmid	12	0	11+0	0	0+0	0	1+0	0
2	DF	(England) ENG	Benjamin Arthur	6	0	5+1	0	0+0	0	0+0	0
4	DF	(England) ENG	Josh Knight	1	0	0+1	0	0+0	0	0+0	0
5	DF	(Wales) WAL	Regan Poole	12	0	9+2	0	0+0	0	1+0	0
6	DF	(Republic of Ireland) IRL	Conor Shaughnessy	7	1	6+0	1	0+0	0	1+0	0
7	MF	(England) ENG	Marlon Pack	14	0	12+2	0	0+0	0	0+0	0
8	MF	(England) ENG	John Swift	2	0	0+1	0	0+0	0	0+1	0
9	FW	(England) ENG	Colby Bishop	10	1	5+4	1	0+0	0	1+0	0
10	FW	(Australia) AUS	Adrian Segečić	17	3	15+1	2	0+0	0	1+0	1
11	FW	(England) ENG	Abu Kamara	15	0	14+1	0	0+0	0	0+0	0
16	DF	(England) ENG	Jayden Meghoma	10	0	10+0	0	0+0	0	0+0	0
17	FW	(Saint Kitts and Nevis) SKN	Tyrese Shade	10	1	7+3	1	0+0	0	0+0	0
19	MF	(Estonia) EST	Rocco Shein	10	0	7+2	0	0+0	0	1+0	0
20	FW	(Australia) AUS	Thomas Waddingham	5	2	0+4	2	0+0	0	0+1	0
21	FW	(England) ENG	Keshi Anderson	2	0	0+2	0	0+0	0	0+0	0
22	DF	(England) ENG	Zak Swanson	15	2	10+4	2	0+0	0	1+0	0
23	FW	(England) ENG	Josh Murphy	5	0	0+5	0	0+0	0	0+0	0
24	DF	(Northern Ireland) NIR	Terry Devlin	15	4	10+4	4	0+0	0	1+0	0
25	FW	(England) ENG	Ryan Kavuma-McQueen	14	1	9+5	1	0+0	0	0+0	0
27	MF	(England) ENG	Odin Bailey	10	0	2+7	0	0+0	0	0+1	0
28	FW	(New Zealand) NZL	Luke Brooke-Smith	4	0	1+2	0	0+0	0	1+0	0
29	FW	(Serbia) SRB	Marko Milovanović	13	3	7+5	3	0+0	0	0+1	0
31	GK	(Poland) POL	Daniel Bielica	4	0	4+0	0	0+0	0	0+0	0
32	FW	(Northern Ireland) NIR	Eoin Kenny	2	0	0+1	0	0+0	0	0+1	0
34	FW	(England) ENG	Harvey Blair	1	0	0+1	0	0+0	0	0+0	0
37	MF	(Comoros) COM	Iyad Mohamed	9	0	6+3	0	0+0	0	0+0	0
38	DF	(The Gambia) GAM	Ebou Adams	16	2	7+8	2	0+0	0	1+0	0
55	DF	(Senegal) SEN	Madiodio Dia	11	0	10+1	0	0+0	0	0+0	0
Player(s) who featured but departed permanently during the season:
16	MF	(South Africa) RSA	Luke Le Roux	1	0	0+0	0	0+0	0	1+0	0

=== Disciplinary record ===
As of match played 7 November 2026

No.	Pos	Nat	Player	Total		Championship		FA Cup		EFL Cup	
No.	Pos	Nat	Player	Yellow card	Red card	Yellow card	Red card	Yellow card	Red card	Yellow card	Red card
1	GK	(Austria) AUT	Nicolas Schmid	1	0	1	0	0	0	0	0
5	DF	(Wales) WAL	Regan Poole	2	0	2	0	0	0	0	0
7	MF	(England) ENG	Marlon Pack	1	0	1	0	0	0	0	0
10	FW	(Australia) AUS	Adrian Segečić	1	0	0	0	0	0	1	0
16	DF	(England) ENG	Jayden Meghoma	3	0	3	0	0	0	0	0
19	MF	(Estonia) EST	Rocco Shein	1	0	1	0	0	0	0	0
22	DF	(England) ENG	Zak Swanson	2	0	2	0	0	0	0	0
24	DF	(Northern Ireland) NIR	Terry Devlin	3	0	3	0	0	0	0	0
25	FW	(England) ENG	Ryan Kavuma-McQueen	2	0	2	0	0	0	0	0
29	FW	(Serbia) SER	Marko Milovanović	3	0	3	0	0	0	0	0
37	MF	(Comoros) COM	Iyad Mohamed	1	0	1	0	0	0	0	0
38	MF	(The Gambia) GAM	Ebou Adams	6	0	5	0	0	0	1	0
Squad Total				26	0	24	0	0	0	2	0

== Awards ==
=== Player awards ===
==== EFL Championship Goal of the Month ====
Month	Player	Opposition	Result	Ref.
October	(England) Zak Swanson	v. Sheffield United	Nominated	

=== Manager awards ===
==== EFL Championship Player of the Month ====
Month	Manager	Result	Ref.
October	(England) John Mousinho	Nominated	
