= Gustavo Caballero =

Paraguayan footballer (born 2001)

- Caballero with Paraguay in 2026

Personal information
- Full name: Gustavo Rubén Caballero González
- Date of birth: 21 September 2001 (age 25)
- Place of birth: San Lorenzo, Paraguay
- Height: 1.78 m (5 ft 10 in)
- Position: Winger

Team information
- Current team: Santos
- Number: 17

Youth career
- Capiatá

Senior career*
Years	Team	Apps	(Gls)
2019	Capiatá	7	(0)
2022	Ameliano	12	(2)
2022–2025	Nacional Asunción	89	(17)
2023	→ Ameliano (loan)	8	(0)
2025–	Santos	22	(1)
2026	→ Portsmouth (loan)	12	(1)

International career^{‡}
2024–	Paraguay U23	7	(0)
2026–	Paraguay	6	(3)
- * Club domestic league appearances and goals as of 17:28, 19 November 2026 (UTC) ‡ National team caps and goals as of 22:10, 13 November 2026 (UTC)

Gustavo Rubén Caballero González (born 21 September 2001) is a Paraguayan professional footballer who plays as a winger for Campeonato Brasileiro Série A club Santos, and the Paraguay national team.

He began his career in his country's APF División de Honor, playing 116 games and scoring 19 goals for Deportivo Capiatá, Sportivo Ameliano, and Nacional Asunción. After finishing as joint top scorer of the Apertura in 2025, he transferred to Santos, who then loaned him to Portsmouth.

Caballero represented the Paraguay under-23 team at the 2024 Olympic tournament. He made his senior international debut in 2026 and was chosen for the 2026 FIFA World Cup.

== Club career ==
=== Deportivo Capiatá ===
A Deportivo Capiatá youth graduate, Caballero signed his first professional contract on 1 July 2019. He made his debut in the Paraguayan Primera División on 12 July, starting for in a 1–0 home win over Sportivo Luqueño.

Caballero featured in seven league matches for Capiatá during the 2019 season, as the club suffered relegation, and also helped the side to reach the semifinals of the 2019 Copa Paraguay.

=== Sportivo Ameliano ===
After the 2020 season was cancelled due to the COVID-19 pandemic, Caballero also spent the 2021 campaign unemployed before going on a trial at Sportivo Ameliano in January 2022; initially a member of the reserve team, he impressed during the pre-season and earned himself a first team spot. He scored his first professional goal on 20 March 2022, netting the opener in a 2–0 away win over Olimpia.

Caballero contributed with two goals and two assists in 12 matches for Ameliano during the 2022 Apertura tournament.

=== Nacional Asunción ===
In July 2022, Caballero joined Nacional Asunción, who had been in irregular form and mid-table positions in the first half of the season. In his second match for La Academia on 25 July, he scored his first goal in a 2–1 win at 12 de Octubre.

On 28 February 2023, Caballero scored his first continental goal in the Copa Libertadores, albeit in a 5–1 loss away to Sporting Cristal of Peru, eliminating his side 5–3 on aggregate; he was soon afterwards demoted to the reserve team as a punishment for alleged tactical disobedience.

==== Loan to Ameliano ====
In July 2023, Caballero returned to Ameliano for the second half of the season. He only managed to make eight appearances for the side, with only three starts.

==== Breakthrough ====
Back to Nacional for the 2024 campaign, Caballero soon established himself as a starter. On 5 September of that year, he scored a hat-trick in a 5–0 Copa Paraguay away routing of Cristóbal Colón de Juan Augusto Saldívar. His performances attracted the interest of Olimpia, but nothing came of it.

Caballero was the top scorer of the 2025 Apertura tournament with nine goals (along with Juan Iturbe), which led to a move to Libertad on 7 July of that year. Five days later, however, the deal collapsed amidst interest from foreign clubs.

=== Santos ===
In July 2025, Campeonato Brasileiro Série A side Vasco da Gama made an offer to obtain Caballero on loan for US$400,000 with an option to purchase for US$2.2 million. On 24 July however, Santos of the same league announced his signing on a four-year contract, paying US$1.6 million for 50% of his economic rights.

Caballero made his debut for Peixe on 26 July 2025, being deployed as a right wing-back in a 2–2 away draw against Sport Recife. He scored his first goal for the club on 10 August, netting the winner in a 2–1 away success over Cruzeiro; he also provided the assist to Guilherme's equaliser.

==== Loan to Portsmouth ====
On 2 February 2026, the last day of the transfer window, Caballero was loaned to EFL Championship club Portsmouth for the rest of the season. Manager John Mousinho said that he had been tracking him since the previous year.

Caballero made his debut for Pompey on 7 February, replacing Andre Dozzell for the last 11 minutes of a 1–0 loss at Preston North End. Two weeks later, he scored his only goal for the club in a 3–1 victory over Millwall at The Den.

== International career ==
=== Under-23 team ===
Caballero made his debut for the Paraguay national under-23 team on 8 June 2024, as a substitute in a 4–0 friendly loss to neighbours Argentina. He was named in the squad for the 2024 Olympic event in France, but was moved to standby after veteran Fabián Balbuena received late permission from Dynamo Moscow.

Caballero was restored to the team days later when Fabrizio Peralta was denied permission by his Brazilian club Cruzeiro, and then dropped again as Julio Enciso was allowed to play by Brighton & Hove Albion. On the day before the tournament, he was finally reinstalled in the squad when Diego González suffered an injury. He played in all three matches in the group stage, but was an unused substitute in Paraguay's quarterfinal loss to Egypt.

=== Senior team ===
Caballero with the Paraguay national team in 2026

In March 2026, Caballero was called up to the Paraguay national team for friendly matches away to Greece and against Morocco in France. He made his debut on 27 March in a 1–0 win over Greece as a substitute for the last 22 minutes, and four days later at the Stade Bollaert-Delelis in Lens, he came off the bench to score a consolation goal in a 2–1 loss to Morocco.

On 1 June 2026, Caballero was included in Gustavo Alfaro's 26-man squad for the 2026 FIFA World Cup. He made substitute appearances in the penalty shootout win over Germany in the last 32, and the 1–0 loss to France in the last 16. In his first start, a friendly away to Singapore on 13 November, he scored twice in a 4–1 win.

== Career statistics ==
=== Club ===
As of 19 November 2026

Club	Season	League			National cup (Note: Includes Copa do Brasil, FA Cup)		Continental		State league (Note: Includes Campeonato Paulista)		Total	
Club	Season	Division	Apps	Goals	Apps	Goals	Apps	Goals	Apps	Goals	Apps	Goals
Deportivo Capiatá	2019	Primera División	7	0	3	0	—		—		10	0
Sportivo Ameliano	2022	Primera División	12	2	0	0	—		—		12	2
Nacional Asunción	2022	Primera División	18	3	3	1	—		—		21	4
Nacional Asunción	2023	Primera División	15	1	0	0	4 (Note: Appearance(s) in Copa Libertadores)	1	—		19	2
Nacional Asunción	2024	Primera División	34	4	4	3	11 (Note: Five appearances in Copa Libertadores, six appearances and one goal in Copa Sudamericana)	1	—		45	5
Nacional Asunción	2025	Primera División	22	9	0	0	2	1	—		24	10
Nacional Asunción	Total		89	17	7	4	17	3	—		113	24
Sportivo Ameliano (loan)	2023	Primera División	8	0	1	0	—		—		9	0
Santos	2025	Série A	12	1	—		—		—		12	1
Santos	2026	Série A	9	0	3	0	2 (Note: Appearance(s) in Copa Sudamericana)	0	1	0	15	0
Santos	Total		21	1	3	0	2	0	1	0	27	1
Portsmouth (loan)	2025–26	EFL Championship	12	1	—		—		—		12	1
Career total			149	21	14	4	19	3	1	0	183	28

=== International ===
As of match played 13 November 2026

Appearances and goals by national team and year
National team	Year	Apps	Goals
Paraguay	2026	6	3
Total		6	3

Scores and results list Paraguay's goal tally first.

No.	Date	Venue	Opponent	Score	Result	Competition
1.	27 March 2026	Stade Bollaert-Delelis, Lens, France	Morocco	1–2	1–2	Friendly
2.	13 November 2026	National Stadium, Kallang, Singapore	Singapore	1–0	4–1	Friendly
3.	13 November 2026	National Stadium, Kallang, Singapore	Singapore	3–1	4–1	Friendly
