= Ebou Adams =

Gambian professional footballer (born 1996)

- Adams in 2026

Personal information
- Full name: Ebrima Adams
- Date of birth: 15 January 1996 (age 30)
- Place of birth: Greenwich, England
- Height: 1.78 m (5 ft 10 in)
- Position: Defensive midfielder

Team information
- Current team: Portsmouth
- Number: 38

Youth career
- 2006–2010: Orpington
- 2010–2014: Dartford

Senior career*
Years	Team	Apps	(Gls)
2014–2016	Dartford	21	(1)
2014–2015	→ Walton Casuals (loan)	26	(2)
2016–2018	Norwich City	0	(0)
2016–2017	→ Braintree Town (loan)	3	(0)
2017–2018	→ Shrewsbury Town (loan)	5	(0)
2018	→ Leyton Orient (loan)	16	(0)
2018–2019	Ebbsfleet United	37	(0)
2019–2022	Forest Green Rovers	108	(9)
2022–2024	Cardiff City	11	(0)
2024	→ Derby County (loan)	17	(1)
2024–2026	Derby County	67	(7)
2026–	Portsmouth	25	(4)

International career^{‡}
2018–	Gambia	32	(2)
- * Club domestic league appearances and goals as of 00:07, 15 October 2026 (UTC) ‡ National team caps and goals as of 17:10, 7 October 2026 (UTC)

Ebrima "Ebou" Adams (born 15 January 1996) is a professional footballer who plays as a defensive midfielder for EFL Championship club Portsmouth. Born in England, he plays for the Gambia national team.

He began his career at Conference National club Dartford, before gaining regular football and attracting interest from Football League clubs while on loan at Walton Casuals. Adams joined Norwich City in February 2016, and had loan spells at National League sides Braintree Town and EFL League One club Shrewsbury Town, he had another loan spell in the National League with Leyton Orient.

In June 2018, Adams signed with Ebbsfleet United of the National League, where he would remind for a year before returning to league football with Forest Green Rovers of EFL League Two in June 2019, where he would play a major part in the clubs League Two title in 2021–22.

In May 2022, Adams signed a three-year contract with EFL Championship club Cardiff City, however he would have to wait a year for his debut as he missed the whole of 2022–23 season due to two injuries. In January 2024, Adams joined Derby County of League One on loan, where he would help the club gain promotion to the Championship; this move was made permanent in July 2024. He left Derby and joined Portsmouth of the Championship in January 2026 for a fee of £500,000.

In November 2017, Adams was called up to represent the Gambian national team. The English-born midfielder qualified through his parents and made his debut against Morocco B.

== Early life ==
Adams was born in Greenwich and attended The John Roan School. After playing his youth football at Sutcliffe Rangers F.C., he joined Dartford's youth ranks at the age of 15. He moved up to the Dartford Academy in August 2012.

== Club career ==
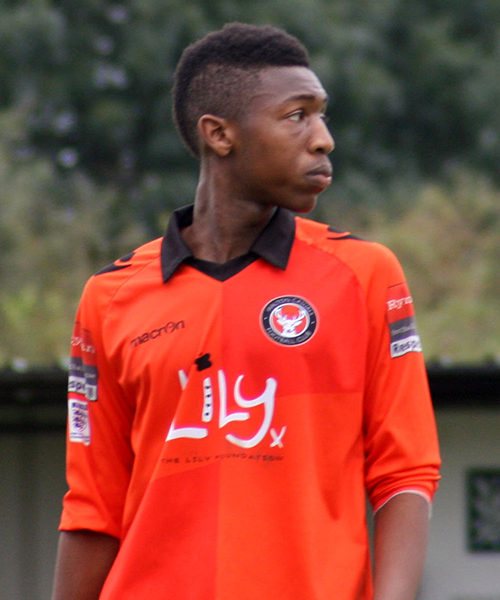
Adams with Walton Casuals in 2014

=== Dartford ===
On 26 April 2014, Adams made his Dartford debut with a 29-minute appearance in a 3–1 defeat to Nuneaton Town. Following his loan at Walton Casuals, he became a regular in the first team set-up and made 16 appearances during the 2015–16 season prior to his departure.

==== Walton Casuals (loan) ====
On 14 September 2014, he joined Isthmian Division One South club Walton Casuals on loan alongside Dartford teammates Kieran Scantlebury and Bode Anidugbe. He scored his first goal for the club in a 5–4 defeat to Whitstable Town the following month. Adams also scored in a 2–0 victory at home to Chipstead in March 2015.

=== Norwich City ===
On 1 February 2016, Adams joined Norwich City on an 18-month contract for an undisclosed fee, becoming Dartford's record sale. He immediately joined up with the Under-23s and made his youth team debut in a 7–0 defeat to a Manchester United team including Sergio Romero, Phil Jones and Memphis Depay.

Adams faced a tough start to life in the professional game with subsequent Premier League 2 appearances against Chelsea, Manchester City and Tottenham Hotspur. He finished the season with nine Premier League 2 appearances and one assist.

Adams scored his first goal for the club in November 2016, completing a 4–1 win over MK Dons in the EFL Trophy. On 6 March 2017, he scored his first goal of the Premier League 2 campaign with the winning strike in a 2–1 victory at Newcastle United.

==== Braintree Town (loan) ====
In December 2016, Adams moved to National League club Braintree Town on a one-month youth loan. On 17 December, he made his debut from the bench in a 1–1 draw at Gateshead. Completing a full 90 minutes in a 1–0 win at Boreham Wood three days later, Adams was dismissed in the 73rd minute of a 3–2 win over Dagenham & Redbridge. A three-game suspension meant he was unable to feature again during his loan.

==== Shrewsbury Town (loan) ====
On 26 June 2017, he joined League One side Shrewsbury Town on a six-month loan. After being named as an unused substitute on the opening day of the season, Adams' debut – a 2–1 EFL Cup exit against Nottingham Forest – proved to be his only defeat with the club. He made his league debut shortly after with an eight-minute appearance from the bench in a 1–0 victory at AFC Wimbledon. He made a further four league appearances all from the bench, although three came in injury time. Adams recorded just 20 minutes of league action during his time with the club, with his final league appearance coming in a 1–1 draw with Blackburn Rovers on 23 September.

Adams also made two appearances in the EFL Trophy, assisting Louis Dodds for the final goal in a 3–0 victory over West Bromwich Albion U23s on 3 October. The match proved to be his final appearance for the club. In his eight appearances for the club, Adams was involved in a single loss – a 2–1 EFL Cup exit against Nottingham Forest on his debut.

On 8 January 2018, Adams returned to parent club Norwich City.

==== Leyton Orient (loan) ====
On 9 January 2018, he joined National League side Leyton Orient on loan for the remainder of the season.

=== Ebbsfleet United ===
On 1 June 2018, Adams joined National League side Ebbsfleet United.

=== Forest Green Rovers ===
On 18 June 2019, Adams moved to League Two club Forest Green Rovers on a two-year deal. Adams would play a major part in Forest Green's 2021–22 EFL League Two title success. He would also be named in the PFA Team of the Year for that season. Adams made 121 appearances for Forest Green in a three-year spell in Gloucestershire.

=== Cardiff City ===
On 13 May 2022, it was announced Adams would join Championship club Cardiff City on a three-year deal on 1 July. His first season was ended in pre-season as he suffered a clean tear of his pectoral muscle tendon 10 minutes into his first pre-season friendly for the club against Cambridge United in July 2022. He was due for a return six months later but then picked up a knee injury which ruled him out for the rest of the season without making a senior first team appearance.

Adams made his debut for Cardiff on 6 August 2023, in a 1–1 draw at Leeds United as a 31st minute substitute for Joe Ralls. He would make 13 appearances for Cardiff during the 2023–24 season.

==== Derby County (loan) ====
On 31 January 2024, Adams joined Derby County of League One, on a loan until the end of the 2023–24 season. Adams made his debut for Derby on 3 February 2024, in a 1–0 win at Charlton Athletic, where he started the game and played 72 minutes, before being substituted by Liam Thompson. Adams became a regular in Derby's midfield and impressed fans and teammates with his performances, Derby head coach Paul Warne was asked in March fans forum about the possibility of making the move permanent, Warne stated this was "less likely than more likely" to happen. On 29 March 2024, Adams scored his first goal for Derby in a 1–0 over Blackpool his goal was a first time effort on the edge of the box in the 40th minute, this goal was announced as Derby's goal of the season at their awards night. Adams received a nomination for League One Player of the Month for March. Adams made 17 appearances during his loan at Derby, as they finished runners-up in League One and secured promotion the Championship. At the end of his loan, Adams said he loved his time at Derby and admitted it would be hard to leave the club as fans chanted "sign him up!" in Derby's final game of the season against Carlisle United where he was named man of the match.

=== Derby County ===
On 17 July 2024, Adams joined Derby County on a permanent basis for an undisclosed transfer fee, signing a three-year contract. On 24 August 2024, Adams scored his first goal of the 2024–25 season in the second minute of a 2-1 loss to Watford at Vicarage Road. On 14 September 2024, Adams missed an open goal in the 97th minute of a 1-0 home victory over former club Cardiff City. Derby head coach Paul Warne called the miss "hilarious" and reminded him of Ronny Rosenthal's infamous miss for Liverpool against Aston Villa in September 1992. Adams was one Derby's best performers in the first two months of the 2024–25 season, with his strengths being his sheer work rate he gives to team, which flaws in his passing game may negate at times. In February 2025, new Derby head coach John Eustace named Adams as Derby's captain. On 23 April 2025, at The Derby County Supporters' Club awards dinner, Adams was announced as their 2024/25 Player of the Year. Each branch of the Supporters' Club ran their own polls on their top performer for Derby throughout the campaign, with the Adams receiving the most votes. One week later, Adams won the Jack Stamps Trophy and the Men's Player's Players of the Season award. Adams played 46 times for Derby during the 2024–25 season, 44 times in the league with six goals scored as Derby successfully fought off relegation back to League One.

Ahead of the 2025–26 season, Adams was named as the new full-time captain of Derby County, after the departure of Nathaniel Mendez-Laing, a role which had filled from February 2025, when Mendez-Laing lost his place in the Derby starting 11. In September 2025, Adams was replaced in the role by new signing Lewis Travis, with head coach Eustace praising the way Adams accepted this change of captaincy, Adams took on the role of vice-captain. Adams played 26 times in Derby's first team during the season, scoring one goal, 23 of the appearances were in league matches. In a two-year spell at Derby, Adams played 89 times for Derby, scoring 8 goals.

=== Portsmouth ===
On 16 January 2026, Adams signed for fellow Championship club Portsmouth on a two-and-a-half year deal for an undisclosed fee, reported to be £500,000. On 25 January 2026, he scored his first goal for the club in a 1–1 draw at home to rivals Southampton in the South Coast derby. The week after, on 31 January 2026, Adams scored his second goal in a Portsmouth shirt, in a 3–0 home win over West Bromwich Albion.

== International career ==
Born in England to Gambian parents, Adams debuted for the Gambia national team in November 2017 against Morocco B. He played in the 2021 Africa Cup of Nations, Gambia's first continental tournament, where they reached the quarter-finals.

== Career statistics ==
=== Club ===
As of match played 14 October 2026

Appearances and goals by club, season and competition
Club	Season	League			FA Cup		League Cup		Other		Total	
Club	Season	Division	Apps	Goals	Apps	Goals	Apps	Goals	Apps	Goals	Apps	Goals
Dartford	2013–14	Conference National	1	0	0	0	—		2 (Note: Appearance(s) in Kent Senior Cup)	0	3	0
Dartford	2014–15	Conference National	4	0	0	0	—		1	0	5	0
Dartford	2015–16	National League South	16	1	1	0	—		2	0	19	1
Dartford	Total		21	1	1	0	—		5	0	27	1
Walton Casuals (loan)	2014–15	Isthmian Division One South	26	2	0	0	—		2 (Note: One appearance in Surrey Senior Cup, one appearance in Southern Combination Challenge Cup)	0	28	2
Norwich City	2015–16	Premier League	0	0	0	0	0	0	—		0	0
Norwich City	2016–17	Championship	0	0	0	0	0	0	1 (Note: Appearance(s) in EFL Trophy)	1	1	1
Norwich City	2017–18	Championship	0	0	0	0	0	0	—		0	0
Norwich City	Total		0	0	0	0	0	0	1	1	1	1
Braintree Town (loan)	2016–17	National League	3	0	0	0	—		0	0	3	0
Shrewsbury Town (loan)	2017–18	League One	5	0	0	0	1	0	2	0	8	0
Leyton Orient (loan)	2017–18	National League	16	0	0	0	0	0	4 (Note: Appearances in FA Trophy)	1	20	1
Ebbsfleet United	2018–19	National League	37	0	1	0	0	0	1	0	39	0
Forest Green Rovers	2019–20	League Two	34	4	3	0	2	0	1	0	40	4
Forest Green Rovers	2020–21	League Two	37	2	0	0	1	0	2 (Note: One appearance in EFL Trophy, one appearance in League Two play-offs)	1	40	3
Forest Green Rovers	2021–22	League Two	37	3	1	0	2	0	1	0	41	3
Forest Green Rovers	Total		108	9	4	0	5	0	4	1	121	10
Cardiff City	2022–23	Championship	0	0	0	0	0	0	—		0	0
Cardiff City	2023–24	Championship	11	0	0	0	2	0	—		13	0
Cardiff City	Total		11	0	0	0	2	0	0	0	13	0
Derby County (loan)	2023–24	League One	17	1	—		—		—		17	1
Derby County	2024–25	Championship	44	6	1	0	1	0	—		46	6
Derby County	2025–26	Championship	23	1	1	0	2	0	—		26	1
Derby County	Total		67	7	2	0	3	0	0	0	72	7
Portsmouth	2025–26	Championship	16	2	—		—		—		16	2
Portsmouth	2026–27	Championship	9	2	0	0	1	0	—		10	2
Portsmouth	Total		25	4	0	0	1	0	0	0	26	4
Career total			334	24	8	0	12	0	19	3	373	27

=== International ===
As of match played 29 September 2026

Appearances and goals by national team and year
National team	Year	Apps	Goals
Gambia	2018	4	0
Gambia	2019	3	0
Gambia	2020	0	0
Gambia	2021	1	0
Gambia	2022	3	0
Gambia	2023	4	0
Gambia	2024	9	1
Gambia	2025	5	1
Gambia	2026	3	0
Total		32	2

Scores and results list Gambia's goal tally first.

No.	Date	Venue	Opponent	Score	Result	Competition
1.	11 June 2024	Stade de Franceville, Franceville, Gabon	Gabon	2–3	2–3	2026 FIFA World Cup qualification
2.	9 September 2025	Nyayo National Stadium, Nairobi, Kenya	Burundi	2–0	2–0	2026 FIFA World Cup qualification

== Honours ==
Forest Green Rovers

- EFL League Two: 2021–22

Derby County

- EFL League One second-place promotion: 2023–24

Individual

- PFA Team of the Year: 2021–22 League Two
- Derby County Player of the Year: 2024–25
