= Zak Swanson =

English footballer

Personal information
- Full name: Zachary Swanson
- Date of birth: 28 September 2000 (age 26)
- Place of birth: Cambridge, England
- Height: 1.89 m (6 ft 2 in)
- Position: Defender

Team information
- Current team: Portsmouth
- Number: 22

Youth career
- 2006–2020: Arsenal

Senior career*
Years	Team	Apps	(Gls)
2020–2022	Arsenal	0	(0)
2020	→ MVV Maastricht (loan)	3	(0)
2022–	Portsmouth	99	(6)
- * Club domestic league appearances and goals as of 00:06, 15 October 2026 (UTC)

Zachary Swanson (born 28 September 2000) is an English footballer who plays as a right-back for EFL Championship club Portsmouth.

== Club career ==
Born in Cambridge, Swanson joined Arsenal at the age of 6 and signed his first professional contract with the club in April 2019. In August 2020, Swanson joined Dutch Eerste Divisie side MVV Maastricht on a season-long loan deal. After making just three appearances, he was recalled in December 2020.

On 4 July 2022, Swanson signed for League One side Portsmouth for an undisclosed fee on a two-year deal with the option for a further year. On 29 October 2022, he scored his first senior goal in a 1–1 draw with Shrewsbury Town.

On 15 May 2026, the club said it had offered the player a new contract.

== Media ==
Swanson was involved in the Amazon Original sports docuseries All or Nothing: Arsenal, which documented the club by spending time with the coaching staff and players behind the scenes both on and off the field throughout their 2021–22 season.

== Career statistics ==
=== Club ===
As of 14 October 2026

Appearances and goals by club, season and competition
Club	Season	League			National cup (Note: Includes FA Cup, KNVB Cup)		League cup (Note: Includes EFL Cup)		Other		Total	
Club	Season	Division	Apps	Goals	Apps	Goals	Apps	Goals	Apps	Goals	Apps	Goals
Arsenal U23	2019–20	–							2 (Note: Appearance(s) in EFL Trophy)	0	2	0
Arsenal U23	2021–22	–							4	0	4	0
Arsenal U23	Total		0	0	0	0	0	0	6	0	6	0
Arsenal	2020–21	Premier League	0	0	0	0	0	0	—		0	0
MVV Maastricht (loan)	2020–21	Eerste Divisie	3	0	0	0	—		—		3	0
Portsmouth	2022–23	League One	15	1	3	0	2	0	5	1	25	2
Portsmouth	2023–24	League One	12	0	1	0	2	0	4	1	19	1
Portsmouth	2024–25	Championship	30	1	1	0	1	0	—		32	1
Portsmouth	2025–26	Championship	33	2	1	0	1	0	—		35	2
Portsmouth	2026–27	Championship	9	2	0	0	1	0	—		10	2
Portsmouth	Total		99	6	6	0	7	0	9	2	121	8
Career total			102	6	6	0	7	0	15	2	130	8

== Honours ==
Portsmouth

- EFL League One: 2023–24
