= Josh Murphy =

English footballer (born 1995)

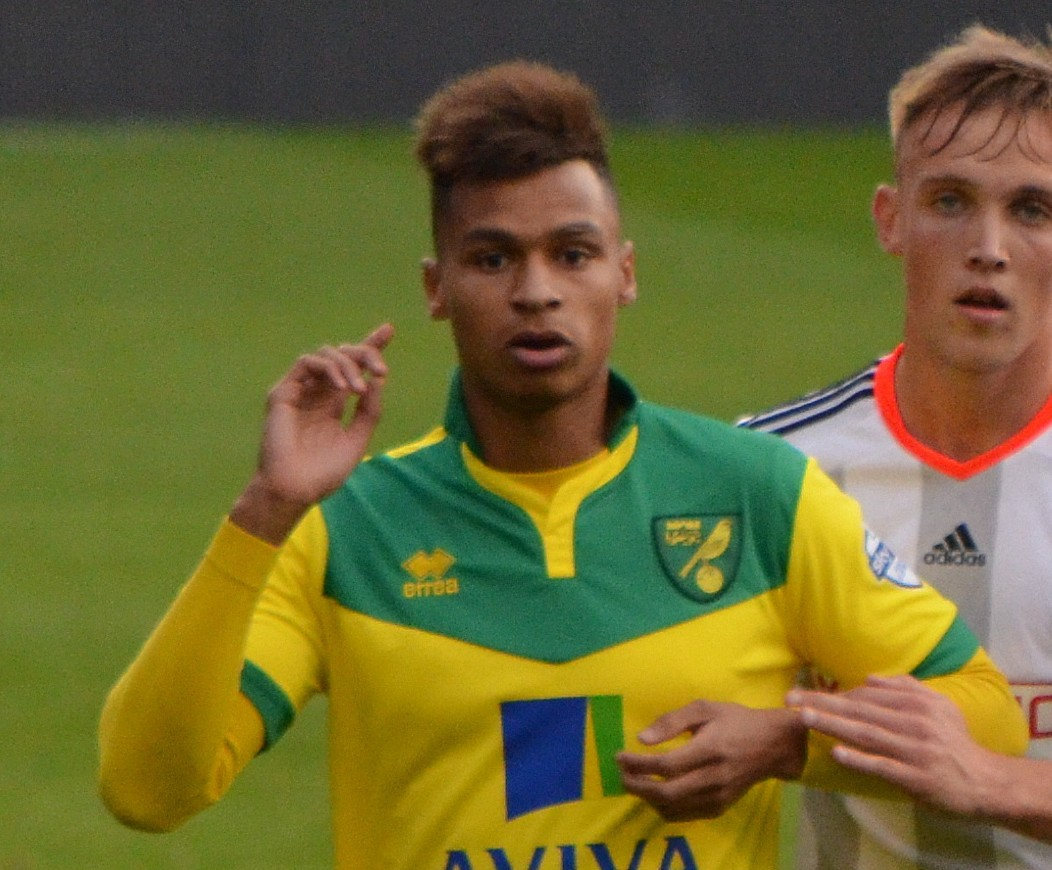
- Murphy playing for Norwich City in 2014

Personal information
- Full name: Joshua Murphy
- Date of birth: 24 February 1995 (age 31)
- Place of birth: Wembley, England
- Height: 5 ft 8 in (1.73 m)
- Position: Winger

Team information
- Current team: Portsmouth
- Number: 23

Youth career
- 2006–2013: Norwich City

Senior career*
Years	Team	Apps	(Gls)
2013–2018	Norwich City	85	(11)
2015	→ Wigan Athletic (loan)	5	(0)
2015–2016	→ Milton Keynes Dons (loan)	42	(5)
2018–2022	Cardiff City	88	(10)
2021–2022	→ Preston North End (loan)	12	(0)
2022–2024	Oxford United	51	(6)
2024–	Portsmouth	47	(10)

International career
2012	England U18	1	(0)
2012–2014	England U19	11	(0)
2014	England U20	3	(1)
- * Club domestic league appearances and goals as of 26 October 2025 (UTC)

Joshua Murphy (born 24 February 1995) is an English professional footballer who plays as a winger for EFL Championship club Portsmouth. He began his career at Norwich City, for whom he scored on his professional debut for in a League Cup match against Watford, and later played for Cardiff City and Oxford United.

== Club career ==
=== Norwich City ===
Murphy, along with his twin brother, Jacob, first played football together from the age of seven and eventually, they both joined Norwich City as under-12s in 2006. It was announced on 31 March 2011, that the brothers joined the club's academy ahead of a new season.

==== 2012–13 season ====
Murphy's first involvement in the Norwich first-team came on 26 September 2012 when he was named as an unused substitute in the club's 1–0 Football League Cup victory over Doncaster Rovers. He was a part of the Norwich City youth team who won the 2012–13 FA Youth Cup where he scored in the final against Chelsea. Murphy signed his first professional contract for Norwich City alongside his brother on 4 January 2013.

==== 2013–14 season ====
He made his professional debut on 24 September 2013, replacing Bradley Johnson in the 67th minute of Norwich's Football League Cup match against Watford, with Norwich 2–0 down. He scored his first professional goal in the 77th minute to pull the score back to 2–1. Norwich eventually went on to win 3–2 in extra time. He made his league debut on 2 November 2013 as a half-time substitute for Steven Whittaker in Norwich's 7–0 league defeat against Manchester City. Then, in December 2013, both Josh and Jacob both signed a three-year contract with the club.

His first senior start was in the FA Cup for Norwich City against Fulham. He set up the first goal and was eventually substituted for his brother Jacob Murphy. In 2014, Josh was awarded Professional of the Year in the West Norfolk Sports Awards, as well as the special achievement award. Soon under management of Neil Adams, Josh had a long run in the first team, making appearance for Norwich City.

==== 2014–15 season ====
Following Norwich City's relegation to the Championship, Murphy made his first start of the 2014–15 season, where he played 90 minutes, and scored twice, which his twin brother Jacob provided one of the two goals Josh scored, in a 3–1 win over Crawley Town in the second round of the League Cup. Murphy's first league goal game in a 3–1 win for Norwich over Blackpool on 27 September 2014.

==== Wigan Athletic (loan) ====
With his first team opportunities limited, Murphy joined Championship club Wigan Athletic on a month's loan. Murphy made his Wigan Athletic debut, coming on as a substitute for Jermaine Pennant in the 55th minute, in a 2–0 loss against Watford on 17 March 2015. Murphy's five appearances at Wigan Athletic soon earned a loan extension until the end of the season. However, Murphy was unable to help Wigan Athletic survive relegation and returned to his parent club.

==== Milton Keynes Dons (loan) ====
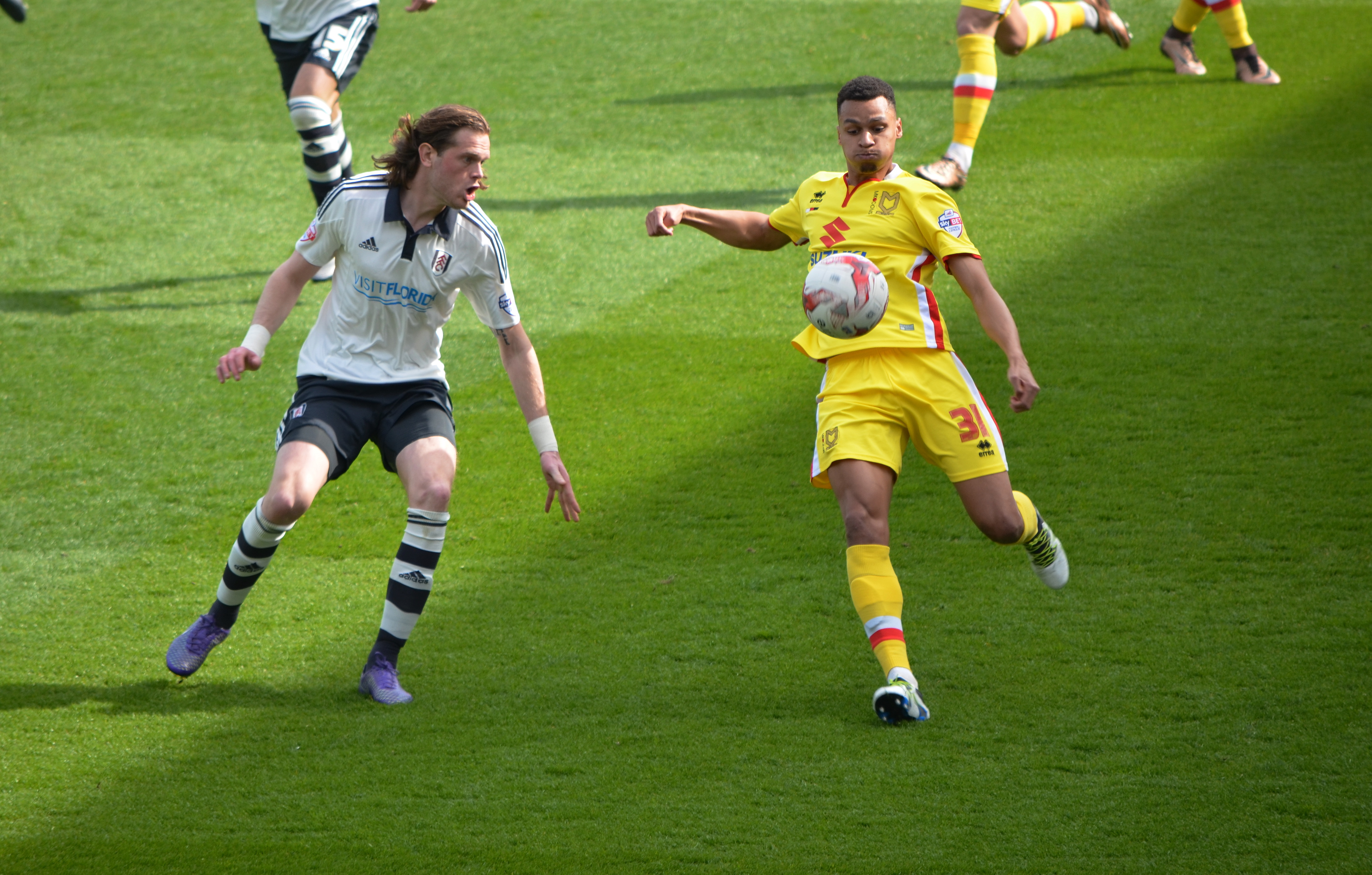
Murphy (right) playing for Milton Keynes Dons in 2016

On 21 August 2015, Murphy joined Championship club Milton Keynes Dons on a season-long loan. He scored the winning goal on his debut in a 2–1 win over Cardiff City in the League Cup 2nd Round. On 26 September 2015, Murphy scored his first league goal in a 1–3 home defeat to Derby County.

On 3 May 2016, Murphy was named Milton Keynes Dons Players' Player of the Year 2015–16. In total, Murphy made 46 appearances for the club, scoring 7 goals in all competitions. Murphy finished the season as the Dons' joint top goalscorer and achieved the most assists.

=== Cardiff City ===
On 12 June 2018, Murphy joined Premier League side Cardiff City on a 4-year contract for an undisclosed fee, believed to be around £11 million. He made his debut for the club on the opening day of the 2018–19 season as a substitute in place of Nathaniel Mendez-Laing during a 2–0 defeat to AFC Bournemouth. Following a short spell on the sidelines, Murphy scored his first Cardiff goal against Burnley, followed by his second in 4–2 win over Fulham. On 10 June 2022, Cardiff announced Murphy would leave the club when his contract expired on June 30.

=== Oxford United ===
On 26 July 2022, Murphy signed a two-year deal with League One side Oxford United. He scored his first goal for the club in a 4–2 league victory over Wigan Athletic on 13 February 2024. On 18 May 2024, he scored both goals in Oxford's 2–0 victory over Bolton Wanderers in the League One play-off final, securing his club's return to the Championship after a 25-year absence from the second tier. Following promotion, the club confirmed that they were in discussions to extend Murphy's contract.

=== Portsmouth ===
On 25 June 2024, Murphy signed a three-year contract, with a one-year extension available, with Championship side Portsmouth.

== International career ==
Both Murphy and his brother were called up by the England U18 team in October 2012 and made their U18s debut in a 1–0 win over Finland U19 on 13 November 2012.

Then in early 2013, Both Josh and Jacob Murphy were called up by England U19 and their U19s debut in a 3–1 win over Denmark U19. Then on 14 November 2013, Josh scored his first England U19 goal in a 4–1 win over Hungary U19.

In late 2014, Murphy was called up by England U20 and scored on his debut on 5 September 2014, in a 6–0 win over Romania U20.

== Personal life ==
Murphy was born in Wembley, London. He is of Nigerian descent through his father and Irish descent through his mother.

He is the twin brother of professional footballer Jacob Murphy. The twins have spoken about their close bonds and being there for each other. Their parents and younger brother live in Downham Market and run the Arbuckles restaurant.

While on the pitch, former manager Chris Hughton instructed the twins to wear different coloured boots so that he could tell them apart. His uncle is former Ipswich Town footballer Tommy Parkin.

== Career statistics ==
As of match played 15 August 2026

Appearances and goals by club, season and competition
Club	Season	League			FA Cup		League Cup		Other		Total	
Club	Season	Division	Apps	Goals	Apps	Goals	Apps	Goals	Apps	Goals	Apps	Goals
Norwich City	2012–13	Premier League	0	0	0	0	0	0	—		0	0
Norwich City	2013–14	Premier League	9	0	2	0	2	1	—		13	1
Norwich City	2014–15	Championship	13	1	1	0	2	2	0	0	16	3
Norwich City	2016–17	Championship	27	4	2	0	3	1	—		32	5
Norwich City	2017–18	Championship	36	6	0	0	3	3	—		39	9
Norwich City	Total		85	11	5	0	10	7	0	0	100	18
Wigan Athletic (loan)	2014–15	Championship	5	0	—		—		—		5	0
Milton Keynes Dons (loan)	2015–16	Championship	42	5	3	1	1	1	—		46	7
Norwich City U23s	2016–17	—			—		—		3 (Note: Appearances in EFL Trophy)	5	3	5
Cardiff City	2018–19	Premier League	29	3	1	0	0	0	—		30	3
Cardiff City	2019–20	Championship	27	5	4	3	0	0	2 (Note: Appearances in Championship play-offs)	0	33	8
Cardiff City	2020–21	Championship	32	2	1	0	1	0	—		34	2
Cardiff City	2021–22	Championship	0	0	0	0	2	1	—		2	1
Cardiff City	Total		88	10	6	3	3	1	2	0	99	14
Preston North End (loan)	2021–22	Championship	12	0	0	0	0	0	—		12	0
Oxford United	2022–23	League One	23	0	1	0	0	0	0	0	24	0
Oxford United	2023–24	League One	28	6	2	0	1	0	7 (Note: Four appearances and two goals in EFL Trophy, three appearances and two goals in League One play-offs)	4	38	10
Oxford United	Total		51	6	3	0	1	0	7	4	62	10
Portsmouth	2024–25	Championship	42	7	0	0	0	0	—		42	7
Portsmouth	2025–26	Championship	16	0	0	0	0	0	—		16	0
Portsmouth	2026–27	Championship	1	0	0	0	0	0	—		1	0
Portsmouth	Total		59	7	0	0	0	0	—		59	7
Career total			342	39	17	4	15	9	12	9	386	61

== Honours ==
Oxford United

- EFL League One play-offs: 2024

Individual

- Milton Keynes Dons Player's Player of the Year: 2015–16
- Portsmouth Player of the Season: 2024–25
