= Terry Devlin =

Northern Irish association football player (born 2003)

Personal information
- Full name: Terry Joseph Devlin
- Date of birth: 6 November 2003 (age 23)
- Place of birth: Cookstown, Northern Ireland
- Height: 1.80 m (5 ft 11 in)
- Position: Utility player

Team information
- Current team: Portsmouth
- Number: 24

Senior career*
Years	Team	Apps	(Gls)
2019–2022	Dungannon Swifts	44	(0)
2022–2023	Glentoran	35	(4)
2023–	Portsmouth	105	(10)

International career^{‡}
2019	Northern Ireland U19	2	(0)
2022–2024	Northern Ireland U21	11	(0)
2025–	Northern Ireland	9	(1)
- * Club domestic league appearances and goals as of 20:18, 11 November 2026 (UTC) ‡ National team caps and goals as of 00:10, 18 November 2026 (UTC)

Terry Joseph Devlin (born 6 November 2003) is a Northern Irish footballer who plays as a utility player for EFL Championship club Portsmouth and the Northern Ireland national team.

== Club career ==
As a child, Terry Devlin was a supporter of Manchester City. Devlin joined Glentoran from Dungannon Swifts on 31 August 2022. Devlin had made his debut for Dungannon Swifts at fifteen years-old. In his one season with Glentoran he became a first team regular and helped the side reach European qualification.

In June 2023, Devlin was announced as a signing for then EFL League One side Portsmouth. His commitment to the club was extended in February 2025 when he agreed to a new three-year deal. After five substitute appearances he made his first league start for Portsmouth on 28 October 2023, and scored the winner as Portsmouth came from 2–0 down to defeat Reading 3–2. In January 2024, he suffered a season-ending shoulder injury.

Having played the majority of the season at right-back, he was named as Portsmouth's Player of the Season for the 2025–26 season.

== International career ==
Devlin played for Northern Ireland U-19 prior to making his Northern Ireland U21 debut against Spain U21 in 2022. In November 2023, he was called up to the senior national side for 2024 European Championships qualifying matches against Denmark and Finland and again in March 2025 for international friendlies against Switzerland and Sweden.

He made his senior debut for Northern Ireland on 20 March 2025, in a 1–1 draw against Switzerland, before making his first start against Sweden on 25 March 2025, in a 5–1 defeat. He scored his first international goal on 14 November 2026, in a 1–0 UEFA Nations League win over Ukraine.

== Style of play ==
Portsmouth manager John Mousinho described Devlin as a versatile player who is comfortable in midfield or at right-back and as having the ability to run, compete, and score goals.

== Career statistics ==
As of match played 7 November 2026

Appearances and goals by club, season and competition
Club	Season	League			National cup (Note: Includes Irish Cup, FA Cup)		League cup (Note: Includes Northern Ireland Football League Cup, EFL Cup)		Other		Total	
Club	Season	Division	Apps	Goals	Apps	Goals	Apps	Goals	Apps	Goals	Apps	Goals
Dungannon Swifts	2019–20	NIFL Premiership	8	0	0	0	0	0	—		8	0
Dungannon Swifts	2020–21	NIFL Premiership	11	0	0	0	0	0	—		11	0
Dungannon Swifts	2021–22	NIFL Premiership	21	0	3	0	0	0	—		24	0
Dungannon Swifts	2022–23	NIFL Premiership	4	0	3	0	0	0	—		7	0
Dungannon Swifts	Total		44	0	6	0	0	0	—		50	0
Glentoran	2022–23	NIFL Premiership	35	4	3	1	2	1	—		40	6
Portsmouth	2023–24	League One	19	1	1	0	2	0	3 (Note: Appearances in EFL Trophy)	1	25	2
Portsmouth	2024–25	Championship	34	0	1	0	1	0	—		36	0
Portsmouth	2025–26	Championship	38	5	1	0	1	0	—		40	5
Portsmouth	2026–27	Championship	14	4	0	0	1	0	—		15	4
Portsmouth	Total		105	10	3	0	5	0	3	1	116	11
Career total			184	14	12	1	7	1	3	1	206	17

=== International ===
Scores and results list Northern Ireland's goal tally first, score column indicates score after each Devlin goal.

List of international goals scored by Terry Devlin
No.	Date	Venue	Cap	Opponent	Score	Result	Competition
1	14 November 2026	Windsor Park, Belfast, Northern Ireland	8	Ukraine	1–0	1–0	2026–27 UEFA Nations League B

== Honours ==
Portsmouth

- EFL League One: 2023–24

Individual

- Portsmouth Player of the Season: 2025–26
