= 2025–26 Portsmouth F.C. season =

English football club season

Portsmouth
2025–26 season
- Owner-Chairman: Michael Eisner
- Chief Executive Officer: Andrew Cullen
- Manager: John Mousinho
- Stadium: Fratton Park
- EFL Championship: 18th (55 points)
- FA Cup: Third round
- EFL Cup: First round
- Top goalscorer: League: Adrian Segečić (11); All: Adrian Segečić (11)
- Highest home attendance: 20,611 vs. Arsenal (11 January 2026)
- Lowest home attendance: 18,508 vs. Swansea City (10 March 2026)
- Biggest win: 3–0 vs. West Brom (H) (31 January 2026)
- Biggest defeat: 6–1 vs. Q.P.R. (A) (21 March 2026)
Home colours	Away colours	Third colours

The 2025–26 season was the second consecutive season of Portsmouth Football Club in the EFL Championship since their promotion in 2024. In addition to the domestic league, the club would also participate in the FA Cup, and the EFL Cup.

Portsmouth were knocked out of the EFL Cup in the First Round on 12 August 2025 at home to Reading after a 1–2 defeat.

Portsmouth were knocked out of the FA Cup in the Third Round on 11 January 2026 at home to Arsenal after a 1–4 defeat.

Portsmouth concluded the 2025–26 EFL Championship season finishing in 18th position with a total of 55 points.

== Players ==
=== Squad ===
As of 6 February 2026

Note: Flags indicate national team as defined under FIFA eligibility rules; some limited exceptions apply. Players may hold more than one non-FIFA nationality.

No.	Pos.	Nation	Player
1	GK	AUT	Nicolas Schmid
2	DF	ENG	Jordan Williams
3	DF	ENG	Connor Ogilvie
4	DF	ENG	Josh Knight
5	DF	WAL	Regan Poole
6	DF	IRL	Conor Shaughnessy
7	MF	ENG	Marlon Pack (captain)
8	MF	ENG	John Swift
9	FW	ENG	Colby Bishop
10	FW	CRO	Adrian Segečić
11	FW	FRA	Florian Bianchini (on loan from Swansea City)
14	DF	AUS	Hayden Matthews
15	FW	IRL	Franco Umeh
16	MF	RSA	Luke Le Roux
17	DF	SCO	Ibane Bowat
18	MF	HUN	Márk Kosznovszky
20	FW	AUS	Thomas Waddingham
21	MF	ENG	Andre Dozzell

No.	Pos.	Nation	Player
22	DF	ENG	Zak Swanson
23	FW	ENG	Josh Murphy
24	DF	NIR	Terry Devlin
25	FW	NIR	Makenzie Kirk
26	GK	ENG	Josef Bursik
27	FW	IRL	Millenic Alli (on loan from Luton Town)
28	MF	ENG	Reuben Swann
29	FW	ENG	Harvey Blair
30	GK	ENG	Ben Killip
31	GK	SCO	Jordan Archer
34	DF	ENG	Aji Alese (on loan from Sunderland)
36	FW	ENG	Conor Chaplin (on loan from Ipswich Town)
37	FW	ENG	Keshi Anderson
38	MF	GAM	Ebou Adams
40	FW	SCO	Jacob Brown (on loan from Luton Town)
47	FW	PAR	Gustavo Caballero (on loan from Santos)
55	DF	SEN	Madiodio Dia

== Transfers ==
=== In ===
No.	Pos.	Player	Transferred From	Fee	Date	Source
10	FW	(Australia) Adrian Segečić	(Australia) Sydney FC	Undisclosed	18 June 2025	
8	MF	(England) John Swift	(England) West Brom	Free Transfer	15 July 2025	
18	MF	(Hungary) Márk Kosznovszky	(Hungary) MTK	Undisclosed	25 July 2025	
16	MF	(South Africa) Luke Le Roux	(Sweden) IFK Värnamo	Undisclosed	25 July 2025	
4	DF	(England) Josh Knight	(Germany) Hannover 96	Undisclosed	21 August 2025	
26	GK	(England) Josef Bursik	(Belgium) Club Brugge	Undisclosed	1 September 2025	
25	FW	(Northern Ireland) Makenzie Kirk	(Scotland) St Johnstone	Undisclosed	1 September 2025	
15	FW	(Republic of Ireland) Franco Umeh	(England) Crystal Palace	Undisclosed	1 September 2025	
38	MF	(The Gambia) Ebou Adams	(England) Derby County	Undisclosed	16 January 2026	
37	FW	(England) Keshi Anderson	(England) Birmingham City	Free Transfer	20 January 2026	
55	DF	(Senegal) Madiodio Dia	(Norway) Haugesund	Undisclosed	2 February 2026	

=== Out ===
No.	Pos.	Player	Transferred to	Fee	Date	Source
15	FW	(England) Christian Saydee	(England) Wigan Athletic	Undisclosed	19 June 2025	
10	FW	(Australia) Kusini Yengi	(Scotland) Aberdeen	End of Contract	30 June 2025	
18	DF	(England) Cohen Bramall	(England) Luton Town	End of Contract	30 June 2025	
26	MF	(Wales) Tom Lowery	(Scotland) Kilmarnock	End of Contract	30 June 2025	
27	FW	(Republic of Ireland) Anthony Scully	(England) Shrewsbury Town	End of Contract	30 June 2025	
37	DF	(Sweden) Alexander Milošević	Unattached	End of Contract	30 June 2025	
4	DF	(England) Ryley Towler	(England) Lincoln City	Undisclosed	7 July 2025	
32	FW	(Northern Ireland) Paddy Lane	(England) Reading	Undisclosed	31 July 2025	
30	MF	(Scotland) Matt Ritchie	(England) Reading	Mutual Consent	28 August 2025	
-	MF	(Guinea) Abdoulaye Kamara	(Germany) 1. FC Saarbrücken	Mutual Consent	1 September 2025	
-	DF	(Scotland) Tom McIntyre	(Scotland) Aberdeen	Mutual Consent	2 February 2026	
49	FW	(England) Callum Lang	(England) Preston North End	Undisclosed	2 February 2026	

=== Loaned in ===
No.	Pos.	Player	Loaned From	Until	Date	Source
11	FW	(France) Florian Bianchini	(Wales) Swansea City	End of Season	31 July 2025	
47	FW	(South Korea) Yang Min-hyeok	(England) Tottenham Hotspur	6 January 2026 (Note: On 6 January, Yang Min-hyeok was recalled from his season-long loan back to Tottenham)	8 August 2025	
36	FW	(England) Conor Chaplin	(England) Ipswich Town	End of Season	1 September 2025	
27	FW	(Republic of Ireland) Millenic Alli	(England) Luton Town	End of Season	14 January 2026	
34	DF	(England) Aji Alese	(England) Sunderland	End of Season	29 January 2026	
40	FW	(Scotland) Jacob Brown	(England) Luton Town	End of Season	2 February 2026	
47	FW	(Paraguay) Gustavo Caballero	(Brazil) Santos	End of Season	2 February 2026	

=== Loaned out ===
No.	Pos.	Player	Loaned to	Until	Date	Source
33	GK	(England) Toby Steward	(Scotland) St Johnstone	End of Season	8 July 2025	
-	MF	(England) Harry Clout	(England) Farnborough	24 October 2025 (Note: On 24 October, Clout was recalled from his loan at Farnborough and subsequently joined Welling on loan)	8 August 2025	
46	FW	(England) Tayo Singerr	(England) Moneyfields	27 December 2025 (Note: On 30 August, Singerr signed for Moneyfields on an initial one-month loan. On 30 September, Moneyfields extended Singerr's loan by six weeks. Following this, Singerr's stay at Moneyfields was extended on a month-to-month arrangement agreed between the clubs to aid his development. Singerr made his last appearance for Moneyfields on 27 December)	29 August 2025	
16	DF	(Scotland) Tom McIntyre	(England) Bradford City	14 January 2026 (Note: On 14 January, McIntyre's initial season-long loan at Bradford City was terminated)	1 September 2025	
28	MF	(England) Reuben Swann	(England) Havant & Waterlooville	31 October 2025	3 October 2025	
-	MF	(England) Harry Clout	(England) Welling United	19 December 2025	24 October 2025	
-	MF	(England) Harry Clout	(England) Havant & Waterlooville	16 January 2026	19 December 2025	
28	MF	(England) Reuben Swann	(England) Havant & Waterlooville	20 February 2026	19 December 2025	
19	DF	(Australia) Jacob Farrell	(Australia) Western Sydney Wanderers	End of Season	6 February 2026	
46	FW	(England) Tayo Singerr	(England) Gosport Borough	End of Season	6 March 2026	

== Pre-season and friendlies ==
On 29 May, Portsmouth announced they would visit Bratislava, Slovakia for a pre-season training camp and matches against Woking, Farnborough and Havant & Waterlooville. A day later, a fourth fixture was confirmed, against Crawley Town. A trip to face Reading was then later added to the schedule. On 30 June, it was announced that Eredivisie side PEC Zwolle would visit Fratton Park during pre-season.

Win Draw Loss Fixtures

15 July 2025 Friendly	Woking	0–2	Portsmouth	Woking
19:00 BST		Report	Segečić 13'; Lane 64'	Stadium: Kingfield Stadium; Attendance: 1,691 (711 Pompey fans); Referee: Isaac Searle

16 July 2025 Friendly	Farnborough	0–5	Portsmouth	Farnborough
19:00 BST		Report	Swanson 14'; Clout 63'; Pack 71'; Waddingham 78'; Murphy 82'	Stadium: Cherrywood Road; Attendance: 2,897; Referee: Dean Treleaven

19 July 2025 Friendly	Portsmouth	1–0	Crawley Town	Hilsea, Portsmouth
15:00 BST	Ogilvie 30'	Report		Stadium: Portsmouth F.C. Training Ground
Note: Initially the match was postponed due to an unplayable playing surface at Broadfield Stadium. Instead the match was played at Portsmouth's training ground behind closed doors.

26 July 2025 Friendly	Reading	0–4	Portsmouth	Reading
15:00 BST		Report	Williams 4'; Lang 23'; Bishop 45+2', 55'	Stadium: Madejski Stadium; Attendance: 3,954 (1,280 Pompey fans); Referee: Gavin Ward

29 July 2025 Friendly	Havant & Waterlooville	0–0	Portsmouth	Havant
19:00 BST	Seager (penalty missed) 89'	Report		Stadium: Westleigh Park; Attendance: 3,602

30 July 2025 Friendly	Brighton & Hove Albion U21	0–4	Portsmouth	Lancing
12:00 BST		Report	Waddingham 11', 56'; Murphy 62'; Lane 70'	Stadium: Elite Football Performance Centre; Attendance: 0 (behind closed doors)

2 August 2025 Friendly	Portsmouth	1–0	PEC Zwolle	Portsmouth
15:00 BST	Waddingham 89'	Report	Oosting (yellow card) 68'; Graves Jensen (yellow card) 83'	Stadium: Fratton Park; Attendance: 8,237 (226 away fans); Referee: Tom Kirk

== Competitions ==
=== Overall record ===
Competition	Starting round	Final position	Record							
Competition	Starting round	Final position	Pld	W	D	L	GF	GA	GD	Win %
EFL Championship	Matchday 1	18th	46	14	13	19	49	64	−15	30.43
FA Cup	Third Round	Third Round	1	0	0	1	1	4	−3	0.00
EFL Cup	First Round	First Round	1	0	0	1	1	2	−1	0.00
Total			48	14	13	21	51	70	−19	29.17

Last updated: 2 May 2026
Source: Soccerway

=== EFL Championship ===
==== League table ====
Pos	Team	Pld	W	D	L	GF	GA	GD	Pts
16	Watford	46	14	15	17	53	65	−12	57
17	Stoke City	46	15	10	21	51	56	−5	55
18	Portsmouth	46	14	13	19	49	64	−15	55
19	Charlton Athletic	46	13	14	19	44	58	−14	53
20	Blackburn Rovers	46	13	13	20	42	56	−14	52

Source: EFL Official Website
Rules for classification: 1) Points; 2) Goal difference; 3) Number of goals scored; 4) Head-to-head results; 5) Wins; 6) Away goals; 7) Penalty points (sec 9.5); 8) Number of 12-point sending off offences; 9) Play-off (only if needed to determine promotion/relegation)

==== League results summary ====
Overall								Home						Away					
Pld	W	D	L	GF	GA	GD	Pts	W	D	L	GF	GA	GD	W	D	L	GF	GA	GD
46	14	13	19	49	64	−15	55	8	6	9	25	23	+2	6	7	10	24	41	−17

Last updated: 2 May 2026.
Source: Soccerway

==== League results by round ====
Round	1	2	3	4	5	6	7	8	9	10	11	12	13	14	15	16	17	18	20	21	22	23	24	25	27	28	29	30	31	32	19^{1}	33	34	35	36	37	38	39	40	41	42	26^{2}	43	44	45	46
Ground	A	H	A	H	A	H	A	H	H	A	H	H	A	H	A	H	A	H	A	H	A	H	H	A	A	A	H	H	A	H	A	A	A	H	A	H	H	A	A	H	A	H	H	A	A	H
Result	W	L	D	W	D	L	L	D	W	D	L	L	L	D	L	W	L	L	L	W	D	D	W	L	W	D	D	W	L	L	W	W	L	L	D	L	L	L	D	D	W	W	W	L	W	D
Position	6	13	11	8	9	13	17	17	14	14	17	18	20	20	20	19	20	22	22	21	21	22	21	21	21	21	21	20	19	21	19	19	19	19	19	19	20	21	21	21	21	19	18	19	18	18
Points	3	3	4	7	8	8	8	9	12	13	13	13	13	14	14	17	17	17	17	20	21	22	25	25	28	29	30	33	33	33	36	39	39	39	40	40	40	40	41	42	45	48	51	51	54	55

Updated to match(es) played on 2 May 2026. Source: Soccerway
A = Away; H = Home; W = Win; D = Draw; L = Loss; P = Postponed; AB = Abandoned
Notes:
- ^{1} Matchday 19 (vs. Charlton Athletic) was abandonded to a medical emergency in the crowd.
- ^{2} Matchday 26 (vs. Ipswich Town) was postponed due to a frozen pitch.

==== League matches ====
The league fixtures were released on 26 June 2025.

Win Draw Loss Fixtures

9 August 2025 1	Oxford United	0–1	Portsmouth	Oxford
15:00 BST	Goodrham (yellow card) 64'	Report	Segečić 38'; Swift (yellow card) 41'; Ogilvie (yellow card) 63'	Stadium: Kassam Stadium; Attendance: 11,492 (1,490 away); Referee: Dean Whitestone

16 August 2025 2	Portsmouth	1–2	Norwich City	Portsmouth
12:30 BST	Poole (yellow card) 58'; Bishop (penalty missed) 80'; Segečić 84'; Ogilvie (yellow card) 90+7'; Swift (yellow card) 90+9'	Report	Darling 6', (yellow card) 90+8'; Sargent 14'; Topić (yellow card) 25'; Córdoba (yellow card) 37'	Stadium: Fratton Park; Attendance: 20,382 (1,911 away); Referee: Stephen Martin
Note: Fixture was originally scheduled for a 15:00 kick-off, but was moved for live Sky Sports broadcasting.

23 August 2025 3	West Bromwich Albion	1–1	Portsmouth	West Bromwich
15:00 BST	Campbell (yellow card) 7'; Johnston 26'; Mowatt (yellow card) 70'	Report	Swift (yellow card) 43'; Bishop 56', (yellow card) 66'; Poole (yellow card) 63'; Le Roux (yellow card) 79'; Waddingham (yellow card) 80'	Stadium: The Hawthorns; Attendance: 24,818 (2,473 away); Referee: Elliot Bell
Note: Ryan Mason (W.B.A. manager) (yellow card) 65' (red card) 70'

30 August 2025 4	Portsmouth	1–0	Preston North End	Portsmouth
15:00 BST	Dozzell 41', (yellow card) 48'	Report	Storey (yellow card) 13'; Hughes (yellow card) 34'	Stadium: Fratton Park; Attendance: 20,226 (748 away); Referee: Tony Harrington

14 September 2025 5	Southampton	0–0	Portsmouth	Southampton
12:00 BST	Harwood-Bellis (yellow card) 45+1'; Stephens (yellow card) 47'; Downes (yellow card) 65'; Roerslev (yellow card) 68'	Report	Swanson (yellow card) 45'; Swift (yellow card) 73'	Stadium: St Mary's Stadium; Attendance: 30,889 (2,700 away); Referee: Matthew Donohue
Note: Fixture was originally scheduled for 13 September, but was moved for live Sky Sports broadcasting.

20 September 2025 6	Portsmouth	0–2	Sheffield Wednesday	Portsmouth
15:00 BST	Swanson (yellow card) 45'	Report	Bannan 12'; Cadamarteri (yellow card) 17'; Valery (yellow card) 45'; Brown 50'; Horvath (yellow card) 62'; Iorfa (yellow card) 65'; M. Lowe (yellow card) 79'	Stadium: Fratton Park; Attendance: 20,225 (2,001 away); Referee: Ruebyn Ricardo

27 September 2025 7	Ipswich Town	2–1	Portsmouth	Ipswich
15:00 BST	Philogene 9'; Hirst 41'; Egeli (yellow card) 65'	Report	Dozzell (yellow card) 7'; Le Roux (yellow card) 79'; Pack 90+2'	Stadium: Portman Road; Attendance: 29,141 (2,001 away); Referee: Andrew Kitchen

1 October 2025 8	Portsmouth	2–2	Watford	Portsmouth
19:45 BST	Yang Min-hyeok 9', (yellow card) 13'; Segečić 79'; Pack (yellow card) 90+5'	Report	Alleyne (yellow card) 2'; Petris (yellow card) 43'; Louza 46', (yellow card) 77'; Vata 56'; Selvik (yellow card) 77'; Pollock (yellow card) 89'	Stadium: Fratton Park; Attendance: 19,646 (1,243 away); Referee: Ben Toner

4 October 2025 9	Portsmouth	1–0	Middlesbrough	Portsmouth
15:00 BST	Yang Min-hyeok 23'; Pack (yellow card) 76'; Bursik (yellow card) 83'	Report	Brittain (yellow card) 68'	Stadium: Fratton Park; Attendance: 20,397 (2,158 away); Referee: Anthony Backhouse

18 October 2025 10	Leicester City	1–1	Portsmouth	Leicester
19:45 BST	Pereira (yellow card) 3'; Ramsey 26'	Report	Swift 58'; Yang Min-hyeok (yellow card) 71'; Dozzell (yellow card) 87'	Stadium: King Power Stadium; Attendance: 30,496 (3,292 away); Referee: Farai Hallam
Note: Fixture was originally scheduled for a 15:00 kick-off, but was moved due to a clash with Leicester Tigers also playing.

21 October 2025 11	Portsmouth	1–2	Coventry City	Portsmouth
19:45 BST	Swift (yellow card) 85'; Kirk 90+6'	Report	Thomas-Asante 30', 56'; Van Ewijk (yellow card) 50'	Stadium: Fratton Park; Attendance: 20,321 (2,186 away); Referee: Gavin Ward

25 October 2025 12	Portsmouth	0–1	Stoke City	Portsmouth
12:30 BST	Kirk (yellow card) 35'; Pack (yellow card) 41'	Report	Thomas (yellow card) 48'; Mubama (yellow card) 61'; Matthews 70' (o.g.); Talovierov (yellow card) 87'	Stadium: Fratton Park; Attendance: 20,164 (1,907 away); Referee: Thomas Kirk
Note: Fixture was originally scheduled for a 15:00 kick-off, but was moved live Sky Sports broadcasting.

1 November 2025 13	Birmingham City	4–0	Portsmouth	Birmingham
15:00 GMT	Paik Seung-ho 9'; Klarer (yellow card) 23', (goal) 61'; Iwata 56'; Anderson 88'	Report	Williams (yellow card) 60'	Stadium: St Andrew's; Attendance: 27,903 (2,003 away); Referee: Andrew Kitchen

5 November 2025 14	Portsmouth	0–0	Wrexham	Portsmouth
20:00 GMT	Dozzell (yellow card) 11'; Bishop (yellow card) 73'	Report	Sheaf (yellow card) 41'; Kaboré (yellow card) 69'; Scarr (yellow card) 73'	Stadium: Fratton Park; Attendance: 19,877 (706 away); Referee: Bobby Madley
Note: Fixture was originally scheduled for a 19:45 kick-off, but was moved live Sky Sports broadcasting.

8 November 2025 15	Hull City	3–2	Portsmouth	Kingston upon Hull
12:30 GMT	Coyle 27'; Joseph 42'; Gelhardt 79'; Pandur (yellow card) 90+8'	Report	Devlin 16', 45+2', (yellow card) 62'; Williams (yellow card) 76'; Pack (yellow card) 82'	Stadium: MKM Stadium; Attendance: 23,205 (1,761 away); Referee: Tom Nield
Note: Fixture was originally scheduled for a 15:00 kick-off, but was moved live Sky Sports broadcasting.

22 November 2025 16	Portsmouth	3–1	Millwall	Portsmouth
15:00 GMT	Swanson 22', (yellow card) 66'; Poole (yellow card) 45+4'; Segečić 51'; Williams 89'	Report	McNamara (yellow card) 45+4'; Bryan (red card) 67'; Ivanović 72'	Stadium: Fratton Park; Attendance: 20,423 (2,180 away); Referee: Michael Salisbury

26 November 2025 17	Sheffield United	3–0	Portsmouth	Sheffield
19:45 GMT	Peck 41' (pen.); Bamford 54'; Hamer 73'	Report	Devlin (red card) 39'; Kosznovszky (yellow card) 71'	Stadium: Bramall Lane; Attendance: 23,785 (1,305 away); Referee: Leigh Doughty

29 November 2025 18	Portsmouth	0–1	Bristol City	Portsmouth
12:30 GMT	Dozzell (yellow card) 31'; Poole (yellow card) 49'; Murphy (yellow card) 52'	Report	Mehmeti 17'	Stadium: Fratton Park; Attendance: 20,388 (2,179 away); Referee: Sam Allison
Note: Fixture was originally scheduled for a 15:00 kick-off, but was moved live Sky Sports broadcasting.

9 December 2025 20	Swansea City	1–0	Portsmouth	Swansea
19:45 GMT	Cabango (yellow card) 13'; Franco (yellow card) 45+1'; Cullen 78'	Report	Swift (yellow card) 61'; Pack (yellow card) 90+3'	Stadium: Swansea.com Stadium; Attendance: 18,163 (1,153 away); Referee: Tom Reeves

13 December 2025 21	Portsmouth	2–1	Blackburn Rovers	Portsmouth
15:00 GMT	Matthews (yellow card) 54'; Lang (yellow card) 59', (goal) 62'; Bowat 79'	Report	Ōhashi (yellow card) 28', (goal) 36'; Alebiosu (yellow card) 35'; Miller (yellow card) 45+4'	Stadium: Fratton Park; Attendance: 19,652 (695 away); Referee: Tim Robinson

20 December 2025 22	Derby County	1–1	Portsmouth	Derby
15:00 GMT	Brewster (yellow card) 44'; Matthews 45' (o.g.)	Report	Lang 6'; Dozzell (yellow card) 42'	Stadium: Pride Park; Attendance: 28,877 (2,007 away); Referee: Farai Hallam

26 December 2025 23	Portsmouth	1–1	Queens Park Rangers	Portsmouth
15:00 GMT	Devlin 45'; Segečić (yellow card) 62'	Report	Dunne 61'; Hayden (yellow card) 87'; Norrington-Davies (yellow card) 88'	Stadium: Fratton Park; Attendance: 20,449 (1,926 away); Referee: James Linington

29 December 2025 24	Portsmouth	2–1	Charlton Athletic	Portsmouth
19:45 GMT	Shaughnessy 69'; Poole (yellow card) 74'; Bowat (yellow card) 90+4'; Yang Min-hyeok 90+8'	Report	Bell (yellow card) 59'; Rankin-Costello (yellow card) 61'; Knibbs 90+6'	Stadium: Fratton Park; Attendance: 20,401 (2,168 away); Referee: Paul Tierney

1 January 2026 25	Bristol City	5–0	Portsmouth	Bristol
15:00 GMT	Randell 11'; Mehmeti 24'; Twine 50'; Armstrong 59', 90+3'	Report	Le Roux (yellow card) 22'	Stadium: Ashton Gate; Attendance: 24,649 (2,464 away); Referee: James Bell

17 January 2026 27	Sheffield Wednesday	0–1	Portsmouth	Sheffield
15:00 GMT		Report	Ogilvie (yellow card) 31'; Segečić 65'; Chaplin (yellow card) 77'	Stadium: Hillsborough Stadium; Attendance: 21,351 (1,643 away); Referee: John Busby

21 January 2026 28	Watford	1–1	Portsmouth	Watford
19:45 GMT	Doumbia 79'; Irankunda (yellow card) 90+10'	Report	Dozzell (yellow card) 51'; Segečić 73'	Stadium: Vicarage Road; Attendance: 17,577 (1,774 away); Referee: Ben Toner

25 January 2026 29	Portsmouth	1–1	Southampton	Portsmouth
12:00 GMT	Swanson (yellow card) 70'; Adams 77', (yellow card) 82'	Report	Scienza 57'; Downes (yellow card) 70'	Stadium: Fratton Park; Attendance: 20,290 (2,651 away); Referee: Lewis Smith
Note: Fixture was initially scheduled for 24 January, but was rescheduled for live Sky Sports broadcasting.

31 January 2026 30	Portsmouth	3–0	West Bromwich Albion	Portsmouth
15:00 GMT	Chaplin 20'; Alli 25'; Adams 49'	Report	Phillips (yellow card) 11'; Johnston (yellow card) 22'	Stadium: Fratton Park; Attendance: 20,413 (2,175 away); Referee: Matt Donohue

7 February 2026 31	Preston North End	1–0	Portsmouth	Preston
15:00 GMT	Devine 40'; McCann (yellow card) 71'; Cornell (yellow card) 90'	Report	Alese (yellow card) 90'	Stadium: Deepdale; Attendance: 16,034 (1,748 away); Referee: Adam Herczeg

14 February 2026 32	Portsmouth	0–1	Sheffield United	Portsmouth
15:00 GMT	Swift (yellow card) 25'	Report	Hamer (yellow card) 45+3'; Soumaré (yellow card) 48'; Phillips (yellow card) 89'; Brooks 90'; Hoever (yellow card) 90+7'	Stadium: Fratton Park; Attendance: 20,092 (1,375 away); Referee: James Linington

17 February 2026 19	Charlton Athletic	1–3	Portsmouth	Charlton
19:45 GMT	Clarke (yellow card) 7'; Chambers (yellow card) 14'; Leaburn (yellow card) 27'; Kaminski (yellow card) 34'; Jones (yellow card) 38'; Fevrier 64'; Carey (yellow card) 74'	Report	Devlin 22', 56'; Pack (yellow card) 31'; Bishop 35' (pen.); Adams (yellow card) 87'	Stadium: The Valley; Attendance: 18,713 (2,504 away); Referee: Leigh Doughty
Note: Fixture was originally scheduled for a 15:00 kick-off, but was moved live Sky Sports broadcasting. The match was then abandoned following a medical incident in the crowd.

21 February 2026 33	Millwall	1–3	Portsmouth	Bermondsey
15:00 GMT	De Norre 64'; Crama (yellow card) 75'	Report	Alli (yellow card) 17'; Caballero 46'; Swift 55' , (yellow card) 60'; Pack 67'	Stadium: The Den; Attendance: 19,153 (3,178 away); Referee: Stephen Martin

24 February 2026 34	Wrexham	2–1	Portsmouth	Wrexham
19:45 GMT	Smith 23'; Cleworth 39'	Report	Poole (yellow card) 30'; Swanson 49'	Stadium: Racecourse Ground; Attendance: 10,499 (1,269 away); Referee: Tom Reeves

28 February 2026 35	Portsmouth	0–1	Hull City	Portsmouth
12:30 GMT		Report	Hadžiahmetović (yellow card) 60'; Crooks 73'; Pandur (yellow card) 88'; Coyle (yellow card) 90+6'	Stadium: Fratton Park; Attendance: 20,228 (988 away); Referee: Sam Allison
Note: Fixture was initially scheduled for a 15:00 kick-off, but was rescheduled for live Sky Sports broadcasting.

7 March 2026 36	Blackburn Rovers	1–1	Portsmouth	Blackburn
12:30 GMT	Cashin (yellow card) 83'; Carter 90+3', (yellow card) 90+4'	Report	Ogilvie 84'	Stadium: Ewood Park; Attendance: 14,100 (1,845 away); Referee: Tom Nield
Note: Fixture was initially scheduled for a 15:00 kick-off, but was moved for live Sky Sports broadcasting.

10 March 2026 37	Portsmouth	1–2	Swansea City	Portsmouth
19:45 GMT	Brown 64'; Dia (yellow card) 69'	Report	Galbraith 26'; Vipotnik (yellow card) 33'; Key 39'	Stadium: Fratton Park; Attendance: 18,508 (536 away); Referee: Gavin Ward

16 March 2026 38	Portsmouth	0–1	Derby County	Portsmouth
20:00 GMT	Chaplin (yellow card) 40'; Swift (yellow card) 67'	Report	Szmodics 8', (yellow card) 41'; Clarke (yellow card) 53'; Brereton (yellow card) 78'; Clark (yellow card) 86'; Ward (yellow card) 88'; Fraulo (yellow card) 90+2'	Stadium: Fratton Park; Attendance: 19,253 (1,311 away); Referee: Anthony Backhouse
Note: Fixture was initially scheduled for 14 March, but was rearranged for Sky Sports broadcasting.

21 March 2026 39	Queens Park Rangers	6–1	Portsmouth	Shepherd's Bush
15:00 GMT	Smyth 7', 29', (yellow card) 22'; Kolli 24', 55'; Hayden (yellow card) 32'; Norrington-Davies (yellow card) 73'; Kone 86' (pen.), 87', (yellow card) 90+4'	Report	Adams (yellow card) 32'; Swift 38'; Devlin (yellow card) 90+2'	Stadium: Loftus Road; Attendance: 16,962 (1,760 away); Referee: John Busby

3 April 2026 40	Norwich City	1–1	Portsmouth	Norwich
15:00 BST	Mattsson 26', (yellow card) 67'; Gibbs (yellow card) 46'; Wright (yellow card) 48'	Report	Pack (yellow card) 5'; Ogilvie (yellow card) 16'; Caballero (yellow card) 30'; Mattsson 84' (o.g.); Bishop (yellow card) 87'; Brown (yellow card) 90'	Stadium: Carrow Road; Attendance: 26,613 (1,806 away); Referee: Stephen Martin

6 April 2026 41	Portsmouth	2–2	Oxford United	Portsmouth
12:30 BST	Anderson 9'; Ogilvie (red card) 17'; Dozzell (yellow card) 62', (goal) 87'; Pack (yellow card) 65'	Report	Spencer 48', (yellow card) 59'; Vaulks (yellow card) 61'; Helik (yellow card) 78'; Lankshear 81'	Stadium: Fratton Park; Attendance: 20,356 (2,196 away); Referee: Josh Smith
Note: Fixture was initially scheduled for a 15:00 kick-off, but was brought forward for Sky Sports broadcasting.

11 April 2026 42	Middlesbrough	0–1	Portsmouth	Middlesbrough
15:00 BST	Fry (yellow card) 90+3'	Report	Williams (yellow card) 26'; Anderson (yellow card) 72'; Bishop (yellow card) 89'; Chaplin 90+7'; Pack (yellow card) 90+9'	Stadium: Riverside Stadium; Attendance: 27,017 (1,325 away); Referee: Thomas Kirk

14 April 2026 26	Portsmouth	2–0	Ipswich Town	Portsmouth
20:00 BST	Pack (yellow card) 35'; Shaughnessy 42'; Bishop 44'; Devlin (yellow card) 82'	Report	Núñez (yellow card) 81'; Philogene (yellow card) 90+1'	Stadium: Fratton Park; Attendance: 20,251 (2,190 away); Referee: Farai Hallam
Note: Fixture was originally scheduled for 4 January, but it was postponed due to a frozen pitch. Then it was postponed again on 3 February due to a waterlogged pitch.

18 April 2026 43	Portsmouth	1–0	Leicester City	Portsmouth
12:30 BST	Bowat 63'; Pack (yellow card) 90'; Brown (yellow card) 90+2'	Report	Choudhury (yellow card) 70'; Daka (yellow card) 75'; Ayew (yellow card) 90'	Stadium: Fratton Park; Attendance: 20,344 (2,187 away); Referee: Gavin Ward
Note: Fixture was initially scheduled for a 15:00 kick-off, but was brought forward for Sky Sports broadcasting.

21 April 2026 44	Coventry City	5–1	Portsmouth	Coventry
19:45 BST	Wright 12'; Mason-Clark 47', 76'; Poole 50' (o.g.); Kesler-Hayden 90+1'	Report	Dia (yellow card) 35'; Segečić 69'	Stadium: Coventry Building Society Arena; Attendance: 31,182 (1,638 away); Referee: Andrew Kitchen

25 April 2026 45	Stoke City	1–3	Portsmouth	Stoke-on-Trent
15:00 BST	Cissé 29'	Report	Segečić 32', 66', 82', (yellow card) 82'; Matthews (yellow card) 60'	Stadium: Bet365 Stadium; Attendance: 24,894 (3,024 away); Referee: David Webb

2 May 2026 46	Portsmouth	1–1	Birmingham City	Portsmouth
12:30 BST	Segečić 8', (yellow card) 81'; Le Roux (yellow card) 39'	Report	Priske 19'; Vicente (yellow card) 63'; Osayi-Samuel (yellow card) 82'	Stadium: Fratton Park; Attendance: 20,478 (2,195 away); Referee: John Brooks

=== FA Cup ===
Portsmouth were eliminated from the FA Cup on 11 January 2026 at home to Arsenal in the Third Round.

Win Draw Loss Fixtures

11 January 2026 Third round	Portsmouth	1–4	Arsenal	Portsmouth
14:00 GMT	Bishop 3'; Le Roux (yellow card) 55'	Report	Dozzell 8' (o.g.); Martinelli 25', 51', 72'; Madueke (penalty missed) 43'; Lewis-Skelly (yellow card) 45'; White (yellow card) 68'	Stadium: Fratton Park; Attendance: 20,611 (3,063 away); Referee: Tony Harrington

=== EFL Cup ===
Portsmouth were eliminated from the EFL Cup at home on 12 August 2025 to Reading in the First Round.

Win Draw Loss Fixtures

12 August 2025 First Round	Portsmouth	1–2	Reading	Portsmouth
19:45 BST	Le Roux (yellow card) 53'; Singerr 90+3'; Poole (yellow card) 90+5'	Report	Garcia 34'; Ehibhatiomhan 38'; Fraser (yellow card) 80'; Ryan (yellow card) 90'	Stadium: Fratton Park; Attendance: 14,525 (1,040 away); Referee: Farai Hallam

== Statistics ==
=== Appearances and goals ===
As of match played 2 May 2026

Players with no appearances are not included on the list.
Loaned players in italics

No.	Pos	Nat	Player	Total		Championship		FA Cup		EFL Cup	
No.	Pos	Nat	Player	Apps	Goals	Apps	Goals	Apps	Goals	Apps	Goals
1	GK	(Austria) AUT	Nicolas Schmid	34	0	34+0	0	0+0	0	0+0	0
2	DF	(England) ENG	Jordan Williams	31	1	16+14	1	0+1	0	0+0	0
3	DF	(England) ENG	Connor Ogilvie	33	1	32+0	1	0+1	0	0+0	0
4	DF	(England) ENG	Josh Knight	14	0	10+4	0	0+0	0	0+0	0
5	DF	(Wales) WAL	Regan Poole	43	0	40+1	0	1+0	0	0+1	0
6	DF	(Republic of Ireland) IRL	Conor Shaughnessy	20	2	12+7	2	1+0	0	0+0	0
7	MF	(England) ENG	Marlon Pack	34	2	21+12	2	0+1	0	0+0	0
8	MF	(England) ENG	John Swift	31	3	22+7	3	0+1	0	1+0	0
9	FW	(England) ENG	Colby Bishop	43	4	37+5	3	1+0	1	0+0	0
10	FW	(Australia) AUS	Adrian Segečić	40	11	24+14	11	1+0	0	0+1	0
11	FW	(France) FRA	Florian Bianchini	11	0	6+4	0	0+0	0	0+1	0
14	DF	(Australia) AUS	Hayden Matthews	14	0	9+4	0	0+0	0	1+0	0
15	FW	(Republic of Ireland) IRL	Franco Umeh	2	0	0+1	0	0+1	0	0+0	0
16	MF	(South Africa) RSA	Luke Le Roux	16	0	7+7	0	1+0	0	1+0	0
17	DF	(Scotland) SCO	Ibane Bowat	18	2	8+9	2	0+0	0	1+0	0
18	MF	(Hungary) HUN	Márk Kosznovszky	16	0	6+9	0	0+0	0	1+0	0
19	DF	(Australia) AUS	Jacob Farrell	2	0	0+1	0	0+0	0	1+0	0
20	FW	(Australia) AUS	Thomas Waddingham	7	0	0+6	0	0+0	0	1+0	0
21	MF	(England) ENG	Andre Dozzell	39	2	36+1	2	1+0	0	0+1	0
22	DF	(England) ENG	Zak Swanson	34	2	26+6	2	1+0	0	1+0	0
23	FW	(England) ENG	Josh Murphy	16	0	12+4	0	0+0	0	0+0	0
24	DF	(Northern Ireland) NIR	Terry Devlin	39	5	28+9	5	1+0	0	1+0	0
25	FW	(Northern Ireland) NIR	Makenzie Kirk	14	1	4+10	1	0+0	0	0+0	0
26	GK	(England) ENG	Josef Bursik	11	0	10+0	0	1+0	0	0+0	0
27	FW	(Republic of Ireland) IRL	Millenic Alli	21	1	19+2	1	0+0	0	0+0	0
29	FW	(England) ENG	Harvey Blair	16	0	4+11	0	1+0	0	0+0	0
30	GK	(England) ENG	Ben Killip	5	0	2+2	0	0+0	0	1+0	0
34	DF	(England) ENG	Aji Alese	1	0	0+1	0	0+0	0	0+0	0
36	FW	(England) ENG	Conor Chaplin	37	2	26+10	2	1+0	0	0+0	0
37	MF	(England) ENG	Keshi Anderson	7	1	3+4	1	0+0	0	0+0	0
38	DF	(The Gambia) GAM	Ebou Adams	16	2	14+2	2	0+0	0	0+0	0
40	FW	(Scotland) SCO	Jacob Brown	14	1	5+9	1	0+0	0	0+0	0
46	FW	(England) ENG	Tayo Singerr	2	1	0+1	0	0+0	0	0+1	1
47	MF	(Paraguay) PAR	Gustavo Caballero	12	1	9+3	1	0+0	0	0+0	0
55	DF	(Senegal) SEN	Madiodio Dia	7	0	5+2	0	0+0	0	0+0	0
Player(s) who featured whilst on loan but returned to parent club during the season:
47	MF	(South Korea) KOR	Yang Min-hyeok	16	3	9+6	3	0+0	0	1+0	0
Player(s) who featured but departed permanently during the season:
49	FW	(England) ENG	Callum Lang	8	2	7+1	2	0+0	0	0+0	0

=== Disciplinary record ===
As of match played 2 May 2026

Players with no cards are not included on the list
Italics indicate a loaned in player

No.	Pos	Nat	Player	Total		Championship		FA Cup		EFL Cup	
No.	Pos	Nat	Player	Yellow card	Red card	Yellow card	Red card	Yellow card	Red card	Yellow card	Red card
2	DF	(England) ENG	Jordan Williams	4	0	4	0	0	0	0	0
3	DF	(England) ENG	Connor Ogilvie	4	1	4	1	0	0	0	0
5	DF	(Wales) WAL	Regan Poole	7	0	6	0	0	0	1	0
7	MF	(England) ENG	Marlon Pack	11	0	11	0	0	0	0	0
8	MF	(England) ENG	John Swift	9	0	9	0	0	0	0	0
9	FW	(England) ENG	Colby Bishop	4	0	4	0	0	0	0	0
10	MF	(Australia) AUS	Adrian Segečić	3	0	3	0	0	0	0	0
14	DF	(Australia) AUS	Hayden Matthews	2	0	2	0	0	0	0	0
16	MF	(South Africa) RSA	Luke Le Roux	6	0	4	0	1	0	1	0
17	DF	(Scotland) SCO	Ibane Bowat	1	0	1	0	0	0	0	0
18	MF	(Hungary) HUN	Márk Kosznovszky	1	0	1	0	0	0	0	0
20	FW	(Australia) AUS	Thomas Waddingham	1	0	1	0	0	0	0	0
21	MF	(England) ENG	Andre Dozzell	8	0	7	0	0	0	0	0
22	DF	(England) ENG	Zak Swanson	4	0	4	0	0	0	0	0
23	MF	(England) ENG	Josh Murphy	1	0	1	0	0	0	0	0
24	DF	(Northern Ireland) NIR	Terry Devlin	3	1	3	1	0	0	0	0
25	FW	(Northern Ireland) NIR	Makenzie Kirk	1	0	1	0	0	0	0	0
26	GK	(England) ENG	Josef Bursik	1	0	1	0	0	0	0	0
27	FW	(Republic of Ireland) IRL	Millenic Alli	1	0	1	0	0	0	0	0
34	DF	(England) ENG	Aji Alese	1	0	1	0	0	0	0	0
36	FW	(England) ENG	Conor Chaplin	1	0	1	0	0	0	0	0
37	FW	(England) ENG	Keshi Anderson	1	0	1	0	0	0	0	0
38	DF	(The Gambia) GAM	Ebou Adams	3	0	3	0	0	0	0	0
40	FW	(Scotland) SCO	Jacob Brown	2	0	2	0	0	0	0	0
47	LW	(Paraguay) PAR	Gustavo Caballero	1	0	1	0	0	0	0	0
55	DF	(Senegal) SEN	Madiodio Dia	2	0	2	0	0	0	0	0
Player(s) who featured whilst on loan but returned to parent club during the season:
47	MF	(South Korea) KOR	Yang Min-hyeok	2	0	2	0	0	0	0	0
Player(s) who featured but departed permanently during the season:
49	FW	(England) ENG	Callum Lang	1	0	1	0	0	0	0	0
Squad Total				86	2	83	1	1	0	2	0
