= Franco Umeh =

Irish footballer (born 2005)

Personal information
- Full name: Franco Umeh-Chibueze
- Date of birth: 26 February 2005 (age 21)
- Place of birth: Mahon, Cork, Ireland
- Positions: Winger; forward

Team information
- Current team: Portsmouth
- Number: 15

Youth career
- –2023: Cork City
- 2023–2024: Crystal Palace

Senior career*
Years	Team	Apps	(Gls)
2022–2023	Cork City	2	(0)
2024–2025	Crystal Palace	0	(0)
2025–	Portsmouth	1	(0)

International career^{‡}
2021–2022	Republic of Ireland U17	10	(4)
2022	Republic of Ireland U18	3	(0)
2022–2024	Republic of Ireland U19	10	(4)
2025	Republic of Ireland U21	2	(0)
- * Club domestic league appearances and goals as of 16:27, 5 May 2026 (UTC) ‡ National team caps and goals as of 10:57, 23 October 2026 (UTC)

Franco Umeh-Chibueze (born 26 February 2005) is an Irish professional footballer who plays as winger or forward for EFL Championship club Portsmouth.

== Club career ==
=== Cork City ===
Umeh started his career at Irish club Cork City and signed a professional contract with a €75,000 release clause in 2022. That year, he made his senior league debut for the club as a 17-year-old in June 2022 against Longford Town. He scored 1 goal in 4 appearances in all competitions at for the club at senior level.

=== Crystal Palace ===
Umeh joined Crystal Palace in January 2023. He was part of the Palace U21 team which won the Premier League International Cup, scoring the crucial goal in a 1–0 win over Jong PSV in May 2024. Umeh was called up to the Crystal Palace first team squad on their pre-season tour in the summer of 2024. He subsequently became a regular member of the first team squad during the early part of the 2024–25 season making the bench for several Premier League matches, but was not brought on to make his debut.

=== Portsmouth ===
On 1 September 2025, Umeh joined Portsmouth permanently on a four-year deal for an undisclosed fee. Umeh had to wait over 4 months to make his debut after signing with a hamstring injury, making his debut on 29 December 2025 in a 2–1 victory over Charlton Athletic at Fratton Park. On 11 January 2026, he came off the bench in a 4–1 FA Cup loss to Arsenal before tearing his hamstring, with the injury ending his season.

== International career ==
Born in Ireland, Umeh is of Nigerian descent. Since 2021, he has won caps at youth level for the Republic of Ireland from the U17s team through to the U19s. He made his debut for the Republic of Ireland U21 side against Scotland U21 on 21 March 2025, in a 2–0 defeat.

== Personal life ==
His brother Jaden currently plays for the Benfica under 19s & 23s, while growing up in Ireland they both came through the youth system at Cork City. Jaden received his first Ireland Senior cap in May 2026 against Qatar

== Career statistics ==
As of match played on 11 January 2026

Appearances and goals by club, season and competition
Club	Season	League			National cup (Note: Includes FAI Cup & FA Cup)		League cup (Note: Includes EFL Cup)		Other		Total	
Club	Season	Division	Apps	Goals	Apps	Goals	Apps	Goals	Apps	Goals	Apps	Goals
Cork City	2022	LOI First Division	2	0	1	0	–		1 (Note: Appearance in Munster Senior Cup)	1	4	1
Crystal Palace U21	2023–24	—	—		—		—		2 (Note: Appearances in EFL Trophy)	0	2	0
Crystal Palace U21	2024–25	—	—		—		—		2	1	2	1
Crystal Palace U21	Total		—		—		—		4	1	4	1
Portsmouth	2025–26	Championship	1	0	1	0	0	0	–		2	0
Portsmouth	2026–27	Championship	0	0	0	0	0	0	–		0	0
Portsmouth	Total		1	0	1	0	0	0	–		2	0
Career total			3	0	2	0	0	0	5	2	10	2
