= Harvey Blair =

English footballer (born 2003)

Personal information
- Full name: Harvey Antonio Blair
- Date of birth: 14 September 2003 (age 23)
- Place of birth: Huddersfield, England
- Height: 1.78 m (5 ft 10 in)
- Position: Forward

Team information
- Current team: Portsmouth
- Number: 34

Youth career
- 2015–2021: Liverpool

Senior career*
Years	Team	Apps	(Gls)
2021–2024	Liverpool	0	(0)
2024–	Portsmouth	27	(1)
- * Club domestic league appearances and goals as of 10:18, 12 August 2026 (UTC)

Harvey Antonio Blair (born 14 September 2003) is an English professional footballer who plays as a forward for EFL Championship club Portsmouth.

== Early life ==
Blair was born in Huddersfield, England. He is of Jamaican descent.

== Club career ==
=== Liverpool ===
Blair was originally part of Manchester United's youth setup, but later joined Liverpool as an U12 player. He signed his first professional contract in October 2020. He was later promoted to the Under-18 squad for the 2020–21 season. His first year was greatly impacted by injury as he made just four appearances and scored two goals. In the 2021–22 season, he has made five league appearances and scored one goal for the academy side, impressing enough to be promoted to the senior team.

Blair made his professional debut in an EFL Cup game against Preston North End on 27 October 2021. He was brought off after 55 minutes. Liverpool manager Jürgen Klopp said about Blair's performance: "The game for Harvey in the first half was really not easy and in the second half as well. We didn't really involve him in the game. That doesn't help."

Blair trained with the Liverpool first team in the 2023 pre-season, but sustained a meniscus tear in the first week.

=== Portsmouth ===
On 23 August 2024, Blair signed for Championship club Portsmouth on an initial three-year deal for an undisclosed fee, believed to be initially in the region of £300,000 with the potential to rise to £600,000 should the add-ons be met.

He made his debut one day later, coming on as a 53rd-minute substitute in a 2–2 draw away at Middlesbrough.

He scored his first goal for the club in a 1–1 draw against Sheffield Wednesday on 26 April 2025.

== Style of play ==
Blair has been described as a 'tricky winger' who is 'blessed with good pace, size and ball control'.

He's traditionally played as a left winger under under-18s manager Bridge-Wilkinson, but can also operate as a striker and a little bit deeper in a no.10 role.

== Personal life ==
His father, Vernol, managed Garforth Town in the 2012-13 NPL Division One North season.

His older brother, Marley, was also in the Liverpool academy before being released by the club aged 19. He most recently played for Faroese side Tvøroyrar Bóltfelag, on loan from Havnar Bóltfelag.

His mother died in 2017 as a result of cancer.

Blair is in a relationship with model Alicia Perry, The couple have a son Roman.

== Career statistics ==
As of matches played 25 April 2026

Appearances and goals by club, season and competition
Club	Season	League			FA Cup		EFL Cup		Other		Total	
Club	Season	Division	Apps	Goals	Apps	Goals	Apps	Goals	Apps	Goals	Apps	Goals
Liverpool	2021–22	Premier League	0	0	0	0	1	0	—		1	0
Portsmouth	2024–25	Championship	12	1	0	0	0	0	—		12	1
Portsmouth	2025–26	Championship	15	0	1	0	0	0	—		16	0
Portsmouth	Total		27	1	1	0	0	0	0	0	28	1
Career total			27	1	1	0	1	0	0	0	29	1

== Honours ==
Liverpool

- EFL Cup: 2021–22

Individual

- Liverpool U18s Goal of the Season: 2021-22
