= Harry Clout =

English association football player

Personal information
- Full name: Harry Thomas Clout
- Date of birth: 13 October 2006 (age 20)
- Place of birth: England
- Position: Midfielder

Youth career
- –2025: Portsmouth

Senior career*
Years	Team	Apps	(Gls)
2025–2026	Portsmouth	0	(0)
2025	→ Farnborough (loan)	8	(0)
2025	→ Welling United (loan)	2	(0)
2025–2026	→ Havant & Waterlooville (loan)	0	(0)
- * Club domestic league appearances and goals as of 16:13, 19 December 2025 (UTC)

Harry Thomas Clout (born 30 August 2006) is an English professional footballer who plays as a midfielder.

== Club career ==
Clout began his career with Portsmouth and went onto make his senior debut for the club during an FA Cup tie against Wycombe Wanderers in January 2025. He featured for the final 14 minutes during the 2–0 away defeat. On 5 July 2025, he signed his first professional deal with the club following his breakthrough season.

On 8 August 2025, Clout agreed to join National League South side, Farnborough until January 2026. He went onto feature ten times in all competitions before ending his loan spell early, in October.

On 24 October 2025, Clout joined Isthmian League Premier Division club, Welling United on loan until 3 January 2026.

On 19 December 2025, Clout joined Southern League Premier Division South side, Havant & Waterlooville on a 28-day loan, cutting his spell short with Welling United in the process.

== Career statistics ==
As of match played 11 October 2025

Appearances and goals by club, season and competition
Club	Season	League			FA Cup		EFL Cup		Other		Total	
Club	Season	Division	Apps	Goals	Apps	Goals	Apps	Goals	Apps	Goals	Apps	Goals
Portsmouth	2024–25	Championship	0	0	1	0	0	0	—		1	0
Portsmouth	2025–26	Championship	0	0	0	0	0	0	—		0	0
Portsmouth	Total		0	0	1	0	0	0	—		1	0
Farnborough (loan)	2025–26	National League South	8	0	2	0	—		—		10	0
Welling United (loan)	2025–26	Isthmian League Premier Division	2	0	—		—		2 (Note: One appearance in the FA Trophy, one in the Alan Turvey Trophy)	0	4	0
Havant & Waterlooville (loan)	2025–26	Southern League Premier Division South	0	0	—		—		—		0	0
Career total			10	0	3	0	0	0	2	0	15	0
