= Ibane Bowat =

Scottish footballer

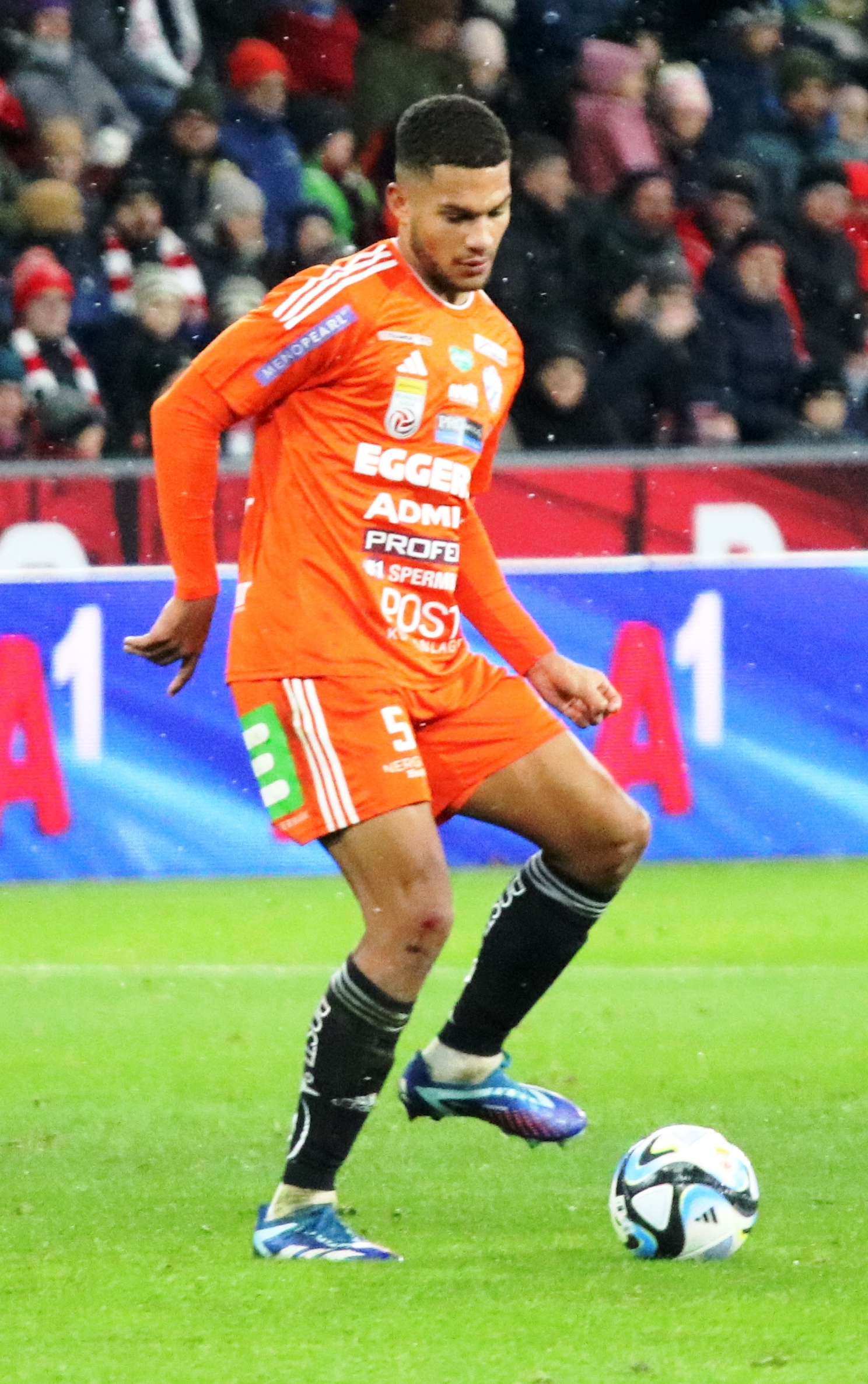
- Bowat with TSV Hartberg in 2023

Personal information
- Full name: Ibane Bowat
- Date of birth: 15 September 2002 (age 24)
- Place of birth: Kingston upon Thames, England
- Height: 1.90 m (6 ft 3 in)
- Position: Centre-back

Team information
- Current team: Huddersfield Town
- Number: 15

Youth career
- 2008–2014: Chelsea
- 2018–2022: Fulham

Senior career*
| Years | Team | Apps | (Gls) |
| 2022–2024 | Fulham | 0 | (0) |
| 2023 | → Den Bosch (loan) | 16 | (0) |
| 2023–2024 | → TSV Hartberg (loan) | 31 | (1) |
| 2024–2026 | Portsmouth | 17 | (2) |
| 2026– | Huddersfield Town | 0 | (0) |

International career
- Scotland U19
| 2022–2024 | Scotland U21 | 7 | (0) |
- * Club domestic league appearances and goals as of 30 December 2025

Ibane Bowat (born 15 September 2002) is a professional footballer who plays as a centre-back for EFL League One club Huddersfield Town. Born in England, he is a youth international for Scotland.

== Early life ==
Born in the London borough of Kingston upon Thames, Bowat was in the academy at Chelsea from under-6 level before leaving at under-12 level. He played less football at the start of his teenage years and played age group rugby union for Harlequins RFC before joining Fulham at under-16 level, having found he missed playing football.

== Club career ==
Bowat joined FC Den Bosch from Fulham in January 2023 on loan with the option to buy. He made his senior debut on 20 January 2023 being named in the starting XI as FC Den Bosch hosted Jong PSV at the De Vliert in the Eerste Divisie. On 13 July 2023, Bowat signed a new contract with Fulham until 2025 and was subsequently loaned out to Austrian Bundesliga side TSV Hartberg.

=== Portsmouth ===
On 30 August 2024 Bowat signed for EFL Championship side Portsmouth on a three-year contract for an undisclosed fee reported to be in the region of £500,000. However, before he had made his debut he suffered a serious knee injury in training in September 2024, rupturing the patella tendon in his right knee as he took a shot on goal, which required him to undergo surgery. Almost one year after being signed, he made his competitive debut for the club on 13 August 2025, starting and playing 61 minutes against Reading in the Carabao Cup. On 1 November 2025, he made his league debut in a 4–0 defeat to Birmingham City. He scored his first league goal for the club on 13 December 2025, scoring the winner in a 2–1 win over Blackburn Rovers.

=== Huddersfield Town ===
On 5 August 2026, Bowat signed for EFL League One club Huddersfield Town on a three-year contract for an undisclosed fee.

== International career ==
Born in England, Bowat qualifies for Scotland via his maternal grandfather hailing from Fife. He is also eligible to play for England, France and Cameroon. He has represented Scotland at Under-19 level and in September 2022 was called up for the first time to the Scotland under-21 squad. He made his Scotland under-21 debut on 7 November 2022 against Iceland under-21 in Motherwell.

== Career statistics ==
As of match played on 13 December 2025

Club statistics
| Club | Season | League | | | National cup (Note: Includes Austrian Cup) | | League cup | | Other | | Total | |
| Club | Season | Division | Apps | Goals | Apps | Goals | Apps | Goals | Apps | Goals | Apps | Goals |
|---|---|---|---|---|---|---|---|---|---|---|---|---|
| Den Bosch (loan) | 2022–23 | Eerste Divisie | 16 | 0 | — | | — | | — | | 16 | 0 |
| TSV Hartberg (loan) | 2023–24 | Austrian Bundesliga | 31 | 1 | 2 | 0 | — | | — | | 33 | 1 |
| Portsmouth | 2024–25 | Championship | 0 | 0 | 0 | 0 | 0 | 0 | 0 | 0 | 0 | 0 |
| Portsmouth | 2025–26 | Championship | 17 | 2 | 0 | 0 | 1 | 0 | 0 | 0 | 18 | 2 |
| Portsmouth | Total | | 17 | 2 | 0 | 0 | 1 | 0 | 0 | 0 | 18 | 2 |
| Career total | | | 64 | 3 | 2 | 0 | 1 | 0 | 0 | 0 | 85 | 3 |
