= Tayo Singerr =

English footballer

Olutayo Singerr
Personal information
- Full name: Olutayo Joseph Kai Singerr
- Date of birth: 22 September 2007 (age 19)
- Place of birth: Southampton, England
- Position: Forward

Team information
- Current team: Portsmouth
- Number: 46

Youth career
- Portsmouth

Senior career*
Years	Team	Apps	(Gls)
2025–	Portsmouth	1	(0)
2025	→ Moneyfields (loan)	18	(14)
2026	→ Gosport Borough (loan)	7	(2)
2026	→ AFC Totton (loan)	1	(0)
- * Club domestic league appearances and goals as of 16:44, 9 July 2026 (UTC)

Olutayo Joseph Kai Singerr (born 22 September 2007) is an English professional footballer who plays as a striker for Gosport Borough on loan from EFL Championship club Portsmouth.

== Club career ==
A youth product of Portsmouth, Singerr was named their academy player of the season for 2025–26.

On 12 August 2025, he debuted for Portsmouth in a 2–1 loss to Reading, and scored his sides only goal. On 30 August 2025, he joined the Isthmian League club Moneyfields on an initial month-long loan. His loan with Moneyfields was extended after scoring 3 goals in his first 6 games.

On 1 January 2026, Singerr made his Championship debut for Portsmouth as a second-half substitute in a 5–0 defeat to Bristol City. He had been recalled from his loan spell with Moneyfields just three days prior, with an injury crisis requiring his return. On 26 January 2026, he signed a first professional contract. In March 2026, he joined Southern League Premier Division South club Gosport Borough on loan.

== Career statistics ==
As of match played 1 January 2026

Appearances and goals by club, season and competition
Club	Season	League			FA Cup		League Cup		Other		Total	
Club	Season	Division	Apps	Goals	Apps	Goals	Apps	Goals	Apps	Goals	Apps	Goals
Portsmouth	2025–26	Championship	1	0	0	0	1	1	0	0	2	1
Moneyfields (loan)	2025–26	Isthmian League South Central Division	18	14	0	0	—		0	0	18	14
Career total			19	14	0	0	1	1	0	0	20	15
