= Luke Le Roux =

South African soccer player (born 2000)

Personal information
- Full name: Luke Gareth Le Roux
- Date of birth: 10 March 2000 (age 26)
- Place of birth: Stellenbosch, South Africa
- Height: 1.84 m (6 ft 0 in)
- Position: Central midfielder

Team information
- Current team: Cercle Brugge
- Number: 18

Youth career
- 2016: Ikapa Sporting

Senior career*
Years	Team	Apps	(Gls)
2016–2020	SuperSport United	0	(0)
2016–2018	→ Stellenbosch (loan)	5	(0)
2020–2023	Varbergs BoIS	92	(3)
2023–2024	Volendam	14	(1)
2024–2025	IFK Värnamo	32	(1)
2025–2026	Portsmouth	14	(0)
2026–	Cercle Brugge	0	(0)

International career^{‡}
2016	South Africa U17	5	(1)
2017–2019	South Africa U20	5	(1)
2021	South Africa U23	1	(0)
2022–	South Africa	9	(0)
- * Club domestic league appearances and goals as of 19 September 2026 ‡ National team caps and goals as of 10 June 2025

Luke Gareth Le Roux (born 10 March 2000) is a South African professional soccer player who plays as a central or defensive midfielder for Belgian Pro League club Cercle Brugge and the South Africa national team.

== Career ==
In August 2023, Le Roux signed for Eredivisie club Volendam on an initial three-year contract with the option for a further season. In July 2024, Le Roux moved to Swedish Allsvenskan club IFK Värnamo on a contract until the end of 2026.

On 25 July 2025, Le Roux signed for EFL Championship club Portsmouth on a three-year deal for an undisclosed fee. On 3 September 2026, his Portsmouth contract was mutually terminated.

On 10 September 2026, Le Roux moved to Cercle Brugge in Belgium on a two-season contract.

== Career statistics ==
As of 21 January 2026

Appearances and goals by club, season and competition
Club	Season	League			National cup (Note: Includes Nedbank Cup, Svenska Cupen, KNVB Cup, FA Cup)		Other		Total	
Club	Season	Division	Apps	Goals	Apps	Goals	Apps	Goals	Apps	Goals
SuperSport United	2016–17	Premier Division	0	0	0	0	0	0	0	0
SuperSport United	2017–18	Premier Division	0	0	0	0	3	0	3	0
SuperSport United	2018–19	Premier Division	0	0	0	0	0	0	0	0
SuperSport United	2019–20	Premier Division	0	0	0	0	0	0	0	0
SuperSport United	Total		0	0	0	0	3	0	3	0
Stellenbosch (loan)	2016–17	National First Division	0	0	0	0	0	0	0	0
Stellenbosch (loan)	2017–18	National First Division	5	0	1	0	0	0	6	0
Stellenbosch (loan)	Total		5	0	1	0	0	0	6	0
Varbergs BoIS	2020	Allsvenskan	21	0	2	0	0	0	23	0
Varbergs BoIS	2021	Allsvenskan	26	0	1	0	0	0	27	0
Varbergs BoIS	2022	Allsvenskan	28	1	3	0	2	0	33	1
Varbergs BoIS	2023	Allsvenskan	17	2	4	1	0	0	21	3
Varbergs BoIS	Total		92	3	10	1	2	0	104	4
FC Volendam	2023–24	Eredivisie	14	1	0	0	0	0	14	1
IFK Värnamo	2024	Allsvenskan	18	1	1	0	0	0	19	1
IFK Värnamo	2025	Allsvenskan	14	0	3	0	0	0	17	0
IFK Värnamo	Total		32	1	4	0	0	0	36	1
Portsmouth	2025–26	EFL Championship	9	0	1	0	1 (Note: Appearance(s) in EFL Cup)	0	11	0
Career total			152	5	16	1	6	0	174	6
