= Andre Dozzell =

English footballer (born 1999)

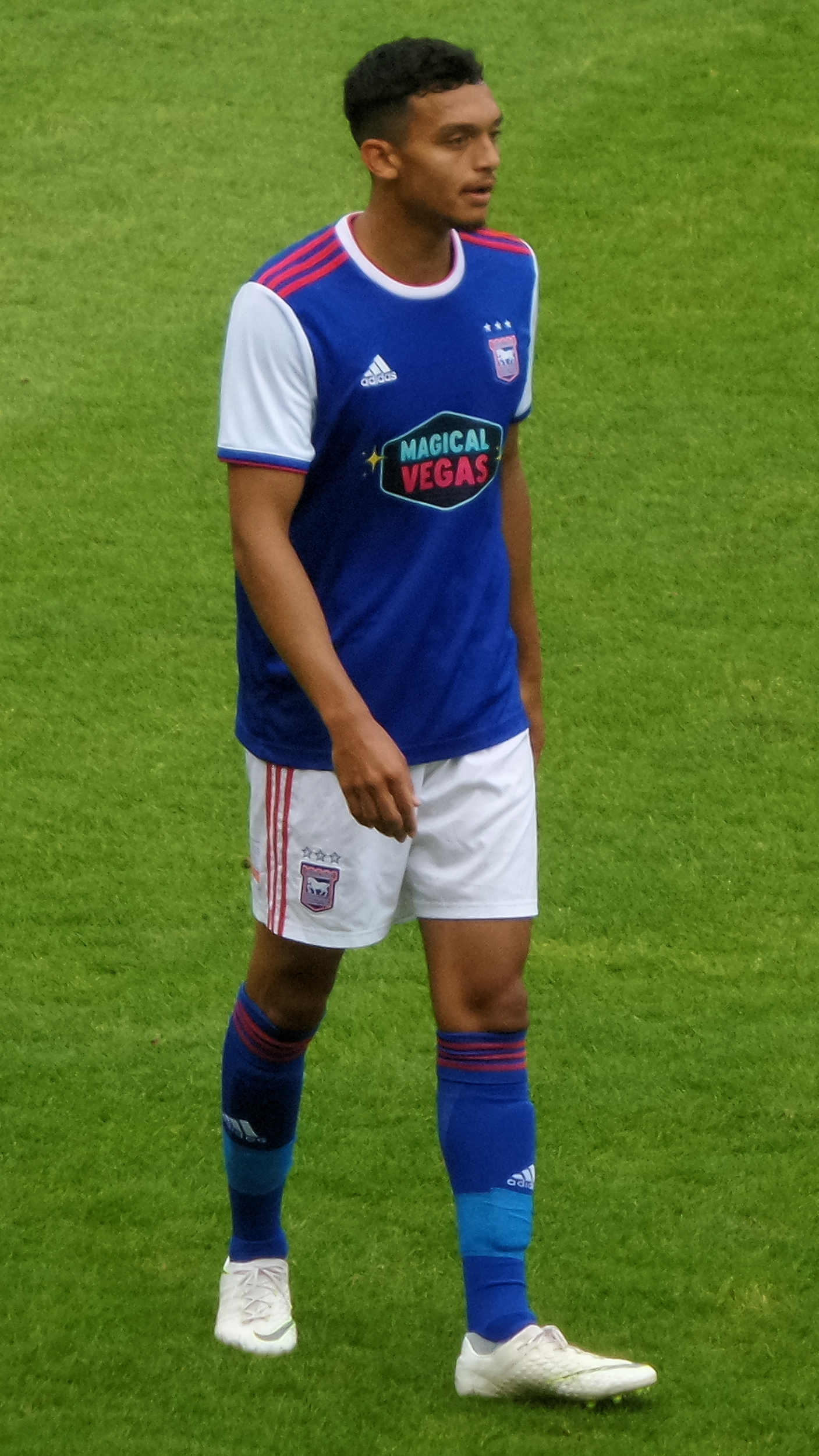
- Dozzell playing for Ipswich Town in 2018

Personal information
- Full name: Andre Leon Dozzell
- Date of birth: 2 May 1999 (age 27)
- Place of birth: Ipswich, England
- Height: 5 ft 10 in (1.78 m)
- Position: Defensive midfielder

Team information
- Current team: D.C. United
- Number: 21

Youth career
- 2008–2016: Ipswich Town

Senior career*
Years	Team	Apps	(Gls)
2016–2021	Ipswich Town	81	(2)
2021–2024	Queens Park Rangers	88	(2)
2024	→ Birmingham City (loan)	10	(1)
2024–2026	Portsmouth	76	(4)
2026–	D.C. United	18	(1)

International career
2014–2015	England U16	9	(1)
2015–2016	England U17	16	(3)
2016–2017	England U18	9	(0)
2017	England U19	4	(0)
2018–2019	England U20	9	(0)
Medal record
Men's football
Representing England
UEFA European Under-19 Championship
Winner	2017 Georgia
- * Club domestic league appearances and goals as of 00:50, 1 November 2026 (UTC)

Andre Leon Dozzell (born 2 May 1999) is an English professional footballer who plays as a defensive midfielder for Major League Soccer club D.C. United.

Dozzell graduated from the academy at his hometown club Ipswich Town, scoring on his senior debut in 2016. He has won caps for England at youth levels from U16 up to U20, helping England U19 to win the 2017 UEFA European Under-19 Championship. He remained at Ipswich for five years, making over 90 appearances, before joining Queens Park Rangers in 2021. He spent the second half of the 2023–24 season on loan at Birmingham City. He played for two seasons with Portsmouth before joining MLS's D.C. United.

== Club career ==
=== Ipswich Town ===
Dozzell is a product of the Ipswich Town youth academy. Born in Ipswich, he joined the youth set-up at his home town club at the age of eight. He worked his way through the youth system at Ipswich, signing his first scholarship with the club in 2013. In April 2016, he was rewarded for his fine form in Ipswich's youth squads with the club's Academy Player of the Year award for the 2015–16 season. On 16 April 2016, Dozzell made his professional debut for Ipswich Town aged 16 in a Championship match against Sheffield Wednesday at Hillsborough, coming on as a substitute at half-time. He scored the equalizing goal for Ipswich on his first-team debut, his first senior goal, matching his father Jason's achievement of scoring on his senior debut, also for Ipswich at the age of 16 in 1984. He made his first league start in the following league match against Fulham on 19 April, in a 1–1 draw at Portman Road.

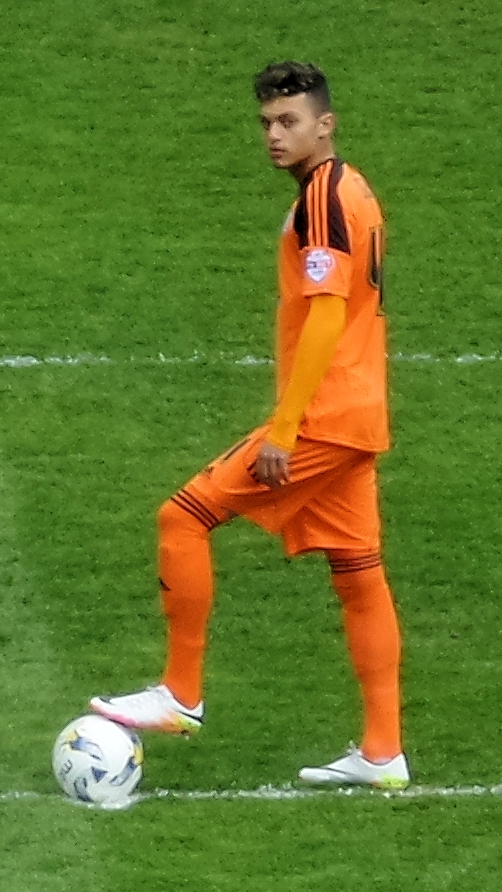
Dozzell playing for Ipswich Town on his senior debut in 2016

Upon turning 17 in May 2016, Dozzell signed his first professional contract with Ipswich, signing a two-year contract, a deal which had initially been agreed in principle upon signing his academy scholarship in 2013. He made nine appearances in total during the following season, including six league starts.

Dozzell signed a new three-year contract on his 18th birthday, on 2 May 2017, keeping him at the club until 2020, with the option of an additional year's extension. On 5 August 2017, Dozzell tore his cruciate ligament during the opening game of the 2017–18 season against Birmingham City at Portman Road, and was ruled out for the rest of the 2017–18 season.

After recovering from the cruciate ligament injury he suffered at the start of the 2017–18 season, Dozzell returned to first-team action during the 2018 pre-season, featuring regularly in friendly matches while completing his injury rehabilitation. He made his return to the Ipswich first-team on 2 October 2018, featuring as a second-half substitute in a match against Middlesbrough, his first appearance in over a year. Dozzell saw his first-team involvement increase during the 2018–19 season, making 21 appearances in all competitions, including scoring in a 3–2 victory over Leeds United at Portman Road in the final game of the season.

He made his first appearance of the 2019–20 season as a substitute in a 1–1 draw with Sunderland on 10 August. After finding regular game time harder to come by during the early part of the season, he scored his first goal of the season on 9 November, scoring the equalising goal in a 1–1 draw with Lincoln City in an FA Cup first round tie at Portman Road. He found game time limited during the 2019–20 season, starting only 8 games in the league. In total, he made 15 appearances over the course of the season, scoring once. On 5 May 2020, Ipswich took up the option to extend Dozzell's contract by a further year, keeping him at the club until 2021.

Dozzell managed to force his way into a starting position in the first-team from early on in the 2020–21 season, changing his role to play primarily as a holding midfielder. He played every minute of the opening 11 league games of the season, until receiving a 72nd minute red card in a match against Sunderland at the Stadium of Light on 3 November, resulting in a three-match suspension. After serving his three-match suspension, he returned to the first-team on 28 November, starting in a 0–2 loss to Charlton Athletic. On 4 December 2020, it was announced that Dozzell had signed a new three-year contract with Ipswich. Dozzell finished the season having made 46 appearances, more than any other Ipswich player during the season, whilst also making more starts than any other player.

=== Queens Park Rangers ===
On 15 June 2021, Dozzell joined Championship club Queens Park Rangers on a three-year contract for an undisclosed fee. He scored his first league goal for the West London side in a 2–0 win away to Middlesbrough on 2 September 2023.

Dozzell joined Championship rivals Birmingham City on 19 January 2024 on loan for the rest of the 2023–24 season. He played regularly under Tony Mowbray's management, scoring the winning goal against Blackburn Rovers and reportedly "dictat[ing] the play" as Birmingham came from behind to beat Sunderland in mid-February. However, after Mowbray took medical leave and the team slipped down the table, Birmingham Live's Alex Dicken thought Dozzell was "found wanting in the grind of a relegation battle", and BBC Sport's Nick Mashiter thought he "made little impact" as Birmingham failed to avoid the drop to League One.

=== Portsmouth ===
After a trial with Sheffield United went well but did not lead to a contract, Dozzell joined Portsmouth, newly promoted to the Championship. He signed a 12-month deal with a club option for a second year. The club exercised the extension option at the end of the 2024–25 season.

=== D.C. United ===
On 6 May 2026, Dozzell rejected the offer of a new contract from Portsmouth, agreeing to join Major League Soccer club D.C. United.

== International career ==
In August 2014, Dozzell was called up to the England U16 squad, having previously been involved in a training camp with the England under-15 set up in January 2014. He made his debut for the under-16's on 20 August 2014, captaining England in a 4–3 friendly defeat to Belgium at St George's Park. He scored his first international goal on 7 November 2014, netting the winner in a 1–0 win over Northern Ireland, with a free kick from 25 yards out. He won 9 caps for England's under-16's between 2014 and 2015, scoring once, whilst also being a part of the squad that won the 2015 Montaigu Tournament.

Dozzell made his England U17 debut on 26 August 2015, in a 3–1 win over Italy at the New Bucks Head stadium, creating the opening goal for Liverpool's Adam Lewis. He scored his first goal for the U17s in a 2–1 win over Turkey on 28 August 2015. Dozzell captained England at U17 level during the 2015–16 season. He was a member of the squad for the 2016 UEFA European Under-17 Championship, starting the Quarter-final defeat against Spain. He won 16 caps at under-17 level between 2015 and 2016, scoring 3 goals.

He made his debut for the England U18 team in a 2–1 win over Italy on 1 September 2016, coming on as a 60th minute substitute for Manchester City's Sadou Diallo. Dozzell won 9 caps for England's under-18 side between 2016 and 2017.

In July 2017 Dozzell played up an age group to win the 2017 UEFA European Under-19 Championship. He made 4 appearances during the tournament, including starting in the 2–1 victory over Portugal in the final of the tournament.

He made his England U20 debut on 15 October 2018, in a 1–1 draw with the Czech Republic. He won his second cap for the under-20 side on 19 November, starting in a 2–0 win over Germany. His third cap came in a 3–1 loss to Poland on 22 March 2019 in the 2018–19 Under 20 Elite League.

In August 2019, Dozzell was once again called up to the England U20 squad for friendlies against Netherlands and Switzerland. He won his fourth cap for the U20s on 5 September, starting in a 0–0 draw with the Netherlands at the New Meadow stadium. He won his fifth cap on 9 September, featuring as a second-half substitute in a 1–0 victory over Switzerland in Basel.

== Personal life ==
Andre is the son of former professional footballer Jason Dozzell. He is of American descent through his paternal grandfather.

== Career statistics ==
As of end of 2025–26 season

Appearances and goals by club, season and competition
Club	Season	League			FA Cup		League Cup		Other		Total	
Club	Season	Division	Apps	Goals	Apps	Goals	Apps	Goals	Apps	Goals	Apps	Goals
Ipswich Town	2015–16	Championship	2	1	0	0	0	0	—		2	1
Ipswich Town	2016–17	Championship	6	0	2	0	1	0	—		9	0
Ipswich Town	2017–18	Championship	1	0	0	0	0	0	—		1	0
Ipswich Town	2018–19	Championship	19	1	1	0	0	0	—		20	1
Ipswich Town	2019–20	League One	10	0	3	1	1	0	1 (Note: Appearance in EFL Trophy)	0	15	1
Ipswich Town	2020–21	League One	43	0	0	0	2	0	1	0	46	0
Ipswich Town	Total		81	2	6	1	4	0	2	0	93	3
Queens Park Rangers	2021–22	Championship	27	0	2	0	4	0	—		33	0
Queens Park Rangers	2022–23	Championship	36	0	1	0	1	0	—		38	0
Queens Park Rangers	2023–24	Championship	25	2	1	0	1	0	—		27	2
Queens Park Rangers	Total		88	2	4	0	6	0	—		98	2
Birmingham City (loan)	2023–24	Championship	10	1	—		—		—		10	1
Portsmouth	2024–25	Championship	39	2	1	0	1	0	—		41	2
Portsmouth	2025–26	Championship	37	1	1	0	1	0	—		39	1
Portsmouth	Total		76	3	2	0	2	0	—		80	3
D.C. United	2026	MLS	0	0	—		0	0	—		0	0
Career total			255	8	12	1	12	0	2	0	281	9

== Honours ==
=== International ===
England U16

- Montaigu Tournament: 2015

England U19

- UEFA European Under-19 Championship: 2017

=== Individual ===
- Ipswich Town Young Player of the Year: 2015–16
