= 2024–25 Portsmouth F.C. season =

126th season in existence of Portsmouth FC

Portsmouth
2024–25 season
- Owner-Chairman: Michael Eisner
- Chief Executive Officer: Andrew Cullen
- Head coach: John Mousinho
- Stadium: Fratton Park
- Championship: 16th (54 points)
- FA Cup: Third round
- EFL Cup: First round
- Top goalscorer: League: Colby Bishop (11); All: Colby Bishop (11)
- Highest home attendance: 20,451 vs. Watford (21 April 2025)
- Lowest home attendance: 19,388 vs Stoke City (22 January 2025)
- Biggest win: 4–0 vs. Swansea City (H) (1 January 2025)
- Biggest defeat: 6–1 vs. Stoke City (A) (2 October 2024)
Home colours	Away colours	Third colours

The 2024–25 season marks Portsmouth Football Club's first season back in the EFL Championship, since the 2011–12 season following their promotion from League One in the previous season. In addition to the domestic league, the club would also participate in the FA Cup, and the EFL Cup.

== Players ==
=== Squad ===
As of 7 March 2025

Note: Flags indicate national team as defined under FIFA eligibility rules; some limited exceptions apply. Players may hold more than one non-FIFA nationality.

No.	Pos.	Nation	Player
2	DF	ENG	Jordan Williams
3	DF	ENG	Connor Ogilvie
4	DF	ENG	Ryley Towler
5	DF	WAL	Regan Poole
6	DF	IRL	Conor Shaughnessy
7	MF	ENG	Marlon Pack (captain)
8	MF	ENG	Freddie Potts (on loan from West Ham United)
9	FW	ENG	Colby Bishop
10	FW	AUS	Kusini Yengi
11	FW	IRL	Mark O'Mahony (on loan from Brighton & Hove Albion)
13	GK	AUT	Nicolas Schmid
14	FW	ENG	Kaide Gordon (on loan from Liverpool)
15	FW	ENG	Christian Saydee
17	FW	FRA	Adil Aouchiche (on loan from Sunderland)
18	DF	ENG	Cohen Bramall
19	DF	AUS	Jacob Farrell
20	FW	AUS	Thomas Waddingham

No.	Pos.	Nation	Player
21	MF	ENG	Andre Dozzell
22	DF	ENG	Zak Swanson
23	FW	ENG	Josh Murphy
24	MF	NIR	Terry Devlin
25	MF	GUI	Abdoulaye Kamara
29	FW	ENG	Harvey Blair
30	MF	SCO	Matt Ritchie
31	GK	SCO	Jordan Archer
32	FW	NIR	Paddy Lane
33	GK	ENG	Toby Steward
34	DF	SCO	Ibane Bowat
35	DF	ENG	Robert Atkinson (on loan from Bristol City)
36	GK	ENG	Ben Killip
37	DF	SWE	Alexander Milošević
44	DF	AUS	Hayden Matthews
45	MF	JAM	Issac Hayden (on loan from Newcastle United)
49	FW	ENG	Callum Lang

== Transfers ==
=== In ===
No.	Pos.	Player	Transferred From	Fee	Date	Source
28	MF	(England) Reuben Swann	(England) AFC Sudbury	Undisclosed	26 June 2024	
31	GK	(Scotland) Jordan Archer	(England) Queens Park Rangers	Free Transfer	1 July 2024	
23	FW	(England) Josh Murphy	(England) Oxford United	Free Transfer	1 July 2024	
2	DF	(England) Jordan Williams	(England) Barnsley	Free Transfer	1 July 2024	
19	DF	(Australia) Jacob Farrell	(Australia) Central Coast Mariners	Undisclosed	26 July 2024	
18	FW	(Denmark) Elias Sørensen	(Denmark) Esbjerg	Undisclosed	2 August 2024	
21	MF	(England) Andre Dozzell	(England) Queens Park Rangers	Free Transfer	5 August 2024	
30	MF	(Scotland) Matt Ritchie	(England) Newcastle United	Free Transfer	6 August 2024	
25	MF	(Guinea) Abdoulaye Kamara	(Germany) Borussia Dortmund	Undisclosed	20 August 2024	
13	GK	(Austria) Nicolas Schmid	(Austria) Blau-Weiß Linz	Undisclosed	21 August 2024	
29	FW	(England) Harvey Blair	(England) Liverpool	Undisclosed	23 August 2024	
34	DF	(Scotland) Ibane Bowat	(England) Fulham	Undisclosed	30 August 2024	
20	FW	(Australia) Thomas Waddingham	(Australia) Brisbane Roar	Undisclosed	22 January 2025	
44	FW	(Australia) Hayden Matthews	(Australia) Sydney FC	Undisclosed	27 January 2025	
18	DF	(England) Cohen Bramall	(England) Rotherham United	Undisclosed	31 January 2025	
36	GK	(England) Ben Killip	(England) Barnsley	Undisclosed	3 February 2025	
37	DF	(Sweden) Alexander Milošević	Unattached	Free	7 March 2025	

=== Out ===
No.	Pos.	Player	Transferred to	Fee	Date	Source
13	GK	(England) Matt Macey	(England) Colchester United	End of Contract	30 June 2024	
17	DF	(Republic of Ireland) Joe Rafferty	(England) Rotherham United	End of Contract	30 June 2024	
20	DF	(England) Sean Raggett	(England) Rotherham United	End of Contract	30 June 2024	
45	MF	(Wales) Lee Evans	(England) Blackpool	End of Contract	30 June 2024	
-	FW	(England) Koby Mottoh	(England) Bournemouth	End of Contract	30 June 2024	
34	DF	(England) Josh Dockerill	(England) Havant & Waterlooville	End of Contract	30 June 2024	
-	MF	(Wales) Harry Jewitt-White	(Northern Ireland) Crusaders	End of Contract	30 June 2024	
-	GK	(England) Bastian Smith	(England) Peterborough United	End of Contract	30 June 2024	
-	DF	(Tanzania) Haji Mnoga	(England) Salford City	End of Contract	30 June 2024	
-	MF	(England) Mitch Aston	(England) Havant & Waterlooville	End of Contract	30 June 2024	
-	FW	(Republic of Ireland) Sam Folarin	Unattached	End of Contract	30 June 2024	
-	DF	(England) Harvey Laidlaw	(England) Havant & Waterlooville	End of Contract	30 June 2024	
29	FW	(England) Josh Martin	Unattached	End of Contract	30 June 2024	
-	MF	(England) Daniel Murray	Unattached	End of Contract	30 June 2024	
-	GK	(England) Malachi Osei-Owusu	Unattached	End of Contract	30 June 2024	
-	DF	(England) Brian Quarm	Unattached	End of Contract	30 June 2024	
31	GK	(England) Ryan Schofield	(England) Morecambe	End of Contract	30 June 2024	
-	MF	(England) Liam Vincent	(England) Tonbridge Angels	End of Contract	30 June 2024	
21	DF	(England) Jack Sparkes	(England) Peterborough United	Undisclosed	26 July 2024	
11	FW	(Northern Ireland) Gavin Whyte	Unattached	Released	30 August 2024	
18	FW	(Denmark) Elias Sørensen	(Norway) Vålerenga	Undisclosed	9 January 2025	
14	MF	(England) Ben Stevenson	(England) Cambridge United	Released	30 January 2025	
1	GK	(England) Will Norris	(England) Wycombe Wanderers	Released	3 February 2025	
17	MF	(England) Owen Moxon	(England) Stockport County	Undisclosed	3 February 2025	

=== Loaned in ===
No.	Pos.	Player	Loaned From	Until	Date	Source
20	FW	(Australia) Samuel Silvera	(England) Middlesbrough	13 January 2025 (Note: On 13 January, Silvera was recalled back to Middlesbrough)	1 July 2024	
8	MF	(England) Freddie Potts	(England) West Ham United	End of Season	26 August 2024	
11	FW	(Republic of Ireland) Mark O'Mahony	(England) Brighton & Hove Albion	End of Season	28 August 2024	
35	DF	(England) Robert Atkinson	(England) Bristol City	End of Season	3 January 2025	
45	MF	(Jamaica) Isaac Hayden	(England) Newcastle United	End of Season	10 January 2025	
17	FW	(France) Adil Aouchiche	(England) Sunderland	End of Season	31 January 2025	
14	FW	(England) Kaide Gordon	(England) Liverpool	End of Season	3 February 2025	

=== Loaned out ===
No.	Pos.	Player	Loaned to	Until	Date	Source
33	GK	(England) Toby Steward	(England) Tonbridge Angels	25 October 2024 (Note: On 25 October, Steward was recalled back from his loan at Tonbridge)	16 July 2024	
28	MF	(England) Reuben Swann	(England) Havant & Waterlooville	End of Season	9 August 2024	
27	FW	(Republic of Ireland) Anthony Scully	(England) Colchester United	14 January 2025 (Note: On 14 January, Colchester opted to end Scully's loan deal)	30 August 2024	
33	GK	(England) Toby Steward	(England) Wealdstone FC	23 November 2024	23 December 2024	
26	MF	(Wales) Tom Lowery	(England) Crewe Alexandra	End of Season	30 January 2025	
27	FW	(Republic of Ireland) Anthony Scully	(England) Colchester United	End of Season	3 February 2025	
16	DF	(Scotland) Tom McIntyre	(England) Charlton Athletic	End of Season	3 February 2025	
33	GK	(England) Toby Steward	(England) Crawley Town	17 April 2025	24 April 2025	

== Pre-season and friendlies ==
On May 31, Pompey announced their first three pre-season friendlies, against Gosport Borough, Havant & Waterlooville and Bognor Regis Town. A fourth was confirmed five days later, versus Milton Keynes Dons. In June, the club announced a pre-season training camp in Pula, Croatia. On 1 July, Portsmouth added a fifth pre-season opposition, away to Charlton Athletic.

Win Draw Loss Fixtures

16 July 2024 Friendly	Gosport Borough	1–3	Portsmouth	Gosport
19:00 BST	Wooden 87'	Report	Murphy 20'; Yengi 61'; Sparkes 90+3'	Stadium: Privett Park; Attendance: 2,009; Referee: Tom Copping

19 July 2024 Friendly	Havant & Waterlooville	0–3	Portsmouth	Havant
19:00 BST		Report	Saydee 19'; Towler 50'; Trialist 59'	Stadium: Westleigh Park; Attendance: 3,520; Referee: Anthony Cross

20 July 2024 Friendly	Bognor Regis Town	0–2	Portsmouth	Bognor Regis
13:00 BST		Report	Williams 23'; Yengi 24'	Stadium: MKM Arena; Referee: Dan Austin

27 July 2024 Friendly	Portsmouth XI	0–4	Wycombe Wanderers	Hilsea
13:30 BST		Report	McCleary; Kone (pen.); Lubala; Trialist	Stadium: Portsmouth F.C. Hilsea Training Ground; Attendance: 0 (behind-closed-doors); Referee: Dean Treleaven
Note: This "match" was actually two 60 minutes halves finishing 0-2 each, played with two different Portsmouth XI teams.

30 July 2024 Friendly	Milton Keynes Dons	1–1	Portsmouth	Denbigh
19:30 BST	Murphy 62'	Report	Lubala 3'	Stadium: Stadium MK; Attendance: 2,317

3 August 2024 Friendly	Charlton Athletic	2–0	Portsmouth	Charlton
15:00 BST	Campbell 9'; Ahadme 51'	Report		Stadium: The Valley; Attendance: 3,909; Referee: Farai Hallam

== Competitions ==
=== Overall record ===
Competition	Starting round	Final position	Record							
Competition	Starting round	Final position	Pld	W	D	L	GF	GA	GD	Win %
EFL Championship	Matchday 1	16th	46	14	12	20	58	71	−13	30.43
FA Cup	Third round	Third Round	1	0	0	1	0	2	−2	0.00
EFL Cup	First round	First Round	1	0	0	1	0	1	−1	0.00
Total			48	14	12	22	58	74	−16	29.17

Last updated: 3 May 2025
Source: Soccerway

=== EFL Championship ===
==== League table ====
Pos	Team	Pld	W	D	L	GF	GA	GD	Pts
14	Watford	46	16	9	21	53	61	−8	57
15	Queens Park Rangers	46	14	14	18	53	63	−10	56
16	Portsmouth	46	14	12	20	58	71	−13	54
17	Oxford United	46	13	14	19	49	65	−16	53
18	Stoke City	46	12	15	19	45	62	−17	51

Source: English Football League
Rules for classification: 1) Points; 2) Goal difference; 3) Number of goals scored; 4) Head-to-head results; 5) Wins; 6) Away goals; 7) Penalty points (sec 9.5); 8) Number of 12-point sending off offences; 9) Play-off (only if needed to determine promotion/relegation)

==== League results summary ====
Overall								Home						Away					
Pld	W	D	L	GF	GA	GD	Pts	W	D	L	GF	GA	GD	W	D	L	GF	GA	GD
46	14	12	20	58	71	−13	54	11	7	5	33	21	+12	3	5	15	25	50	−25

Last updated: 3 May 2025.
Source: Soccerway

==== League results by round ====
Round	1	2	3	4	5	6	7	8	9	10	11	12	13	14	15	18	19	20	21	22	23	24	25	26	16^{1}	27	28	29	17^{2}	30	31	32	33	34	35	36	37	38	39	40	41	42	43	44	45	46
Ground	A	H	A	H	H	A	H	A	H	A	A	H	A	A	H	A	H	H	A	H	A	A	H	A	A	H	H	A	H	H	A	H	A	H	A	H	H	A	H	A	A	H	A	H	A	H
Result	D	D	D	L	L	L	D	L	D	W	L	L	D	L	W	D	W	D	L	W	L	L	W	L	L	W	W	L	L	D	L	W	W	W	L	W	L	L	W	L	L	D	W	W	D	D
Position	9	15	13	18	23	23	23	23	23	23	24	24	24	24	23	24	23	21	22	20	21	23	21	21	23	22	18	21	21	20	20	18	18	17	17	17	17	17	17	17	17	19	18	16	16	16
Points	1	2	3	3	3	3	4	4	5	8	8	8	9	9	12	13	16	17	17	20	20	20	23	23	23	26	29	29	29	30	30	33	36	39	39	42	42	42	45	45	45	46	49	52	53	54

Updated to match(es) played on 3 May 2025. Source: Soccerway
A = Away; H = Home; W = Win; D = Draw; L = Loss; P = Postponed
Notes:
- ^{1} Matchday 16 (vs. Blackburn Rovers) was postponed due to a waterlogged pitch.
- ^{2} Matchday 17 (vs. Millwall) was postponed due to power failure in the local area.

==== League matches ====
On 26 June, the EFL Championship fixtures were announced.

Win Draw Loss Fixtures

10 August 2024 1	Leeds United	3–3	Portsmouth	Leeds
12:30 BST	Struijk 10' (pen.), (yellow card) 78'; Rodon (yellow card) 40'; Gnonto 46'; Aaronson 90+5'	Report	Lang (yellow card) 6', (goal) 41', 90+2' (pen.); Sørensen 23'; Dozzell (yellow card) 45'; Ogilvie (yellow card) 57'; Towler (yellow card) 86'	Stadium: Elland Road; Attendance: 36,432; Referee: Oliver Langford

17 August 2024 2	Portsmouth	0–0	Luton Town	Portsmouth
12:30 BST	Shaughnessy (yellow card) 36'; Pack (yellow card) 42'; Dozzell (yellow card) 60'	Report	Kaminski (yellow card) 29' (yellow-red card) 31'; Clark (yellow card) 74'; Chong (yellow card) 85'	Stadium: Fratton Park; Attendance: 20,293; Referee: John Busby
Note: Fixture was initially scheduled for a 15:00 kick-off, but was moved for live Sky Sports broadcast.

24 August 2024 3	Middlesbrough	2–2	Portsmouth	Middlesbrough
15:00 BST	Clarke 11'; Conway 90' (pen.)	Report	Saydee 2', 25', (yellow card) 43'; Towler (yellow card) 42'; Blair (yellow card) 55'; Norris (yellow card) 57'; Williams (yellow card) 80'	Stadium: Riverside Stadium; Attendance: 26,270; Referee: Matt Donohue

31 August 2024 4	Portsmouth	1–3	Sunderland	Portsmouth
15:00 BST	Kamara (yellow card) 78'; Swanson (yellow card) 88'; O'Nien 90+1' (o.g.); Yengi (yellow card) 90+2'	Report	Swanson 31' (o.g.); Rigg (yellow card) 44'; Browne 51'; Mundle 56'	Stadium: Fratton Park; Attendance: 20,231; Referee: Sam Allison

15 September 2024 5	Portsmouth	0–3	West Bromwich Albion	Portsmouth
15:00 BST	Saydee (yellow card) 9'; Norris (yellow card) 28'; Murphy (yellow card) 35'; Ogilvie (yellow card) 85'; Pack (yellow card) 90+1'	Report	Maja 1'; Ajayi (yellow card) 43'; Mowatt 51', 90+2'; Fellows (yellow card) 63'	Stadium: Fratton Park; Attendance: 20,205; Referee: Leigh Doughty
Note: Fixture was initially scheduled for 14 September, but was moved for live Sky Sports broadcast.

21 September 2024 6	Burnley	2–1	Portsmouth	Burnley
15:00 BST	Cullen (yellow card) 34'; Sarmiento 63'; Flemming (yellow card) 78'; Brownhill 90+4'	Report	Lang 42'; Murphy (yellow card) 48'; Williams (yellow card) 78'	Stadium: Turf Moor; Attendance: 20,476; Referee: David Webb

28 September 2024 7	Portsmouth	0–0	Sheffield United	Portsmouth
15:00 BST	McIntyre (yellow card) 2'; Blair (yellow card) 86'	Report	Ahmedhodžić (yellow card) 41'; Souza (yellow card) 90+6'	Stadium: Fratton Park; Attendance: 20,330; Referee: Matt Donohue

2 October 2024 8	Stoke City	6–1	Portsmouth	Stoke-on-Trent
19:45 BST	Cannon 13', 43', 48' (pen.), 51'; Gallagher 45+1'; Moran 53', (yellow card) 55'; Bae Jun-ho (yellow card) 73'	Report	Lane (yellow card) 26'; O'Mahony 29'	Stadium: Bet365 Stadium; Attendance: 20,824; Referee: Tom Nield

5 October 2024 9	Portsmouth	1–1	Oxford United	Portsmouth
12:30 BST	O'Mahony 58'	Report	Kioso (yellow card) 67'; Sibley 72'	Stadium: Fratton Park; Attendance: 20,125; Referee: Lewis Smith
Note: Fixture was initially scheduled for a 15:00 kick-off, but was moved for live Sky Sports broadcast.

19 October 2024 10	Queens Park Rangers	1–2	Portsmouth	Shepherd's Bush
15:00 BST	Dembélé 9'; Field (yellow card) 47'	Report	Potts 18'; McIntyre (yellow card) 54'; Lang 57' (pen.); Williams (yellow card) 85'; Yengi (yellow card) 90+7'	Stadium: Loftus Road; Attendance: 17,438; Referee: James Linington

22 October 2024 11	Cardiff City	2–0	Portsmouth	Cardiff
19:45 BST	Poole 6' (o.g.); Robinson 13'; Chambers (yellow card) 17'; Rinomhota (yellow card) 79'	Report	Williams (yellow card) 23'; Potts (yellow card) 64'	Stadium: Cardiff City Stadium; Attendance: 18,534; Referee: Oliver Langford

25 October 2024 12	Portsmouth	1–2	Sheffield Wednesday	Portsmouth
20:00 BST	Ogilvie 44'; Lang (yellow card) 73'	Report	Bernard (yellow card) 42'; Windass 55'; Smith 70'; Palmer (yellow card) 80'; Valery (yellow card) 87'	Stadium: Fratton Park; Attendance: 20,262; Referee: Tim Robinson
Note: Fixture was initially scheduled for 26 October, but was moved for live Sky Sports broadcast.

2 November 2024 13	Hull City	1–1	Portsmouth	Kingston upon Hull
15:00 GMT	Pedro 11'; Hughes (yellow card) 65'	Report	Andre Dozzell (yellow card) 53'; Murphy 46'; Ritchie (yellow card) 58'; Moxon (yellow card) 87'	Stadium: MKM Stadium; Attendance: 21,904; Referee: Anthony Backhouse

5 November 2024 14	Plymouth Argyle	1–0	Portsmouth	Plymouth
20:00 GMT	Whittaker (yellow card) 4'; Gray (yellow card) 25'; Gyabi (yellow card) 34'; Pleguezuelo (yellow card) 60'; Obafemi 82'	Report	Lang (yellow card) 67'; Potts (yellow card) 78'	Stadium: Home Park; Attendance: 16,647; Referee: James Bell
Note: Fixture was initially scheduled for a 19:45 kick-off, but was moved for live Sky Sports broadcast.

9 November 2024 15	Portsmouth	3–1	Preston North End	Portsmouth
15:00 GMT	Murphy 36'; Ogilvie 45'; Poole (yellow card) 69'; Bishop 89' (pen.)	Report	Riis 50'	Stadium: Fratton Park; Attendance: 20,295; Referee: John Busby

30 November 2024 18	Swansea City	2–2	Portsmouth	Swansea
15:00 GMT	Cabango (yellow card) 9'; Cullen (yellow card) 36', (goal) 53'; Ogilvie 45+2' (o.g.)	Report	Pack (yellow card) 1'; Ritchie 25', (yellow card) 35'; Murphy 45'; Blair (yellow card) 71'; Dozzell (yellow card) 83'	Stadium: Swansea.com Stadium; Attendance: 15,404; Referee: Will Finnie

7 December 2024 19	Portsmouth	3–0	Bristol City	Portsmouth
15:00 GMT	Bishop 20'; Dozzell (yellow card) 41'; Murphy 62'; Lang 71', (yellow card) 83'	Report	Dickie (yellow card) 8'; Pring (yellow card) 12'; Armstrong (yellow card) 90+2'	Stadium: Fratton Park; Attendance: 20,415; Referee: Sunny Sukhvir Gill

10 December 2024 20	Portsmouth	0–0	Norwich City	Portsmouth
19:45 GMT	Potts (yellow card) 35'; Poole (yellow card) 38'; Moxon (yellow card) 88'	Report	Barnes (yellow card) 19'; Sørensen (yellow card) 30'; Stacey (yellow card) 41'; Duffy (yellow card) 45'; Núñez (yellow card) 60'	Stadium: Fratton Park; Attendance: 20,151; Referee: Andrew Kitchen

13 December 2024 21	Derby County	4–0	Portsmouth	Derby
20:00 GMT	Wilson 8'; Cashin 23'; Adams 29'; Pack 65' (o.g.)	Report	McIntyre (yellow card) 84'	Stadium: Pride Park Stadium; Attendance: 26,980; Referee: Oliver Langford
Note: Fixture was initially scheduled for 14 December, but was moved for live Sky Sports broadcast.

21 December 2024 22	Portsmouth	4–1	Coventry City	Portsmouth
12:30 GMT	Lang 14', 43', 48', 55'; Pack (yellow card) 32'	Report	Bassette 3'	Stadium: Fratton Park; Attendance: 20,330; Referee: Dean Whitestone
Note: Fixture was initially scheduled for a 15:00 kick-off, but was moved for live Sky Sports broadcast.

26 December 2024 23	Watford	2–1	Portsmouth	Watford
15:00 GMT	Baah (yellow card) 30' (red card) 90+8'; Kayembe 57' (pen.), (yellow card) 59'; Vata 90+5'	Report	Swanson 10', (yellow card) 75'; Pack (yellow card) 57'; Schmid (yellow card) 59'; Murphy (yellow card) 60'; Lang (yellow card) 64'; Moxon (yellow card) 90'	Stadium: Vicarage Road; Attendance: 20,696; Referee: Geoff Eltringham

29 December 2024 24	Bristol City	3–0	Portsmouth	Bristol
15:00 GMT	Mehmeti 15', 32'; Dickie 35'; McCrorie (yellow card) 55'	Report	Lang (yellow card) 67'	Stadium: Ashton Gate; Attendance: 24,560; Referee: John Busby

1 January 2025 25	Portsmouth	4–0	Swansea City	Portsmouth
15:00 GMT	Murphy 22'; Lane 29'; Pack (yellow card) 44'; Towler 61'; Bishop 78'	Report		Stadium: Fratton Park; Attendance: 20,427; Referee: James Linington

5 January 2025 26	Sunderland	1–0	Portsmouth	Sunderland
15:00 GMT	Isidor 7'	Report	Towler (yellow card) 58'; Swanson (yellow card) 64'; Pack (red card) 67'	Stadium: Stadium of Light; Attendance: 39,846; Referee: Thomas Bramall
Note: Fixture was initially scheduled for 4 January, but was moved for live Sky Sports broadcast.

15 January 2025 16	Blackburn Rovers	3–0	Portsmouth	Blackburn
19:45 GMT	Tronstad (yellow card) 50'; Gueye 61'; Brittain 71'; Weimann 76'	Report	Potts (yellow card) 19'; Murphy (yellow card) 81'; Devlin (yellow card) 87'	Stadium: Ewood Park; Attendance: 13,703; Referee: Farai Hallam
Note: Fixture was originally scheduled for 23 November, but was postponed due to a waterlogged pitch.

18 January 2025 27	Portsmouth	2–1	Middlesbrough	Portsmouth
15:35 GMT*	Ritchie (yellow card) 40', (goal) 54', 82'	Report	Doak (yellow card) 24'; Latte Lath 30'; Edmundson (yellow card) 55'	Stadium: Fratton Park; Attendance: 20,389; Referee: Gavin Ward
Note: *15:00 GMT kick-off delayed until 15:35 GMT due to a North Stand spectator medical emergency.

22 January 2025 28	Portsmouth	3–1	Stoke City	Portsmouth
19:45 GMT	Bishop 5' (pen.); Lang 9'; Pack (yellow card) 13'; Atkinson (yellow card) 31'; Ogilvie 49'	Report	Wilmot 27'; Seko (yellow card) 33'; Baker (yellow card) 56'; Lowe (yellow card) 79'; Burger (yellow card) 90+1'; Johansson (yellow card) 90+2'	Stadium: Fratton Park; Attendance: 19,388; Referee: Josh Smith

25 January 2025 29	West Bromwich Albion	5–1	Portsmouth	West Bromwich
15:00 GMT	Mowatt 25'; Diangana 32', 44'; Wallace 37'; Swift 56'	Report	Dozzell (yellow card) 60'; Ritchie (yellow card) 62'; Williams (yellow card) 78'; Waddingham 90+3'	Stadium: The Hawthorns; Attendance: 25,261; Referee: Jarred Gillett

28 January 2025 17	Portsmouth	0–1	Millwall	Portsmouth
19:45 GMT		Report	Ivanović 40'; Bangura-Williams (yellow card) 53'; Connolly (yellow card) 62'	Stadium: Fratton Park; Attendance: 19,815; Referee: Dean Whitestone
Note: Fixture was postponed from 27 November 2024 due to power failure in the local area.

1 February 2025 30	Portsmouth	0–0	Burnley	Portsmouth
15:00 GMT	Dozzell (yellow card) 2'; Atkinson (yellow card) 59'; Lang (yellow card) 82'	Report	Roberts (yellow card) 22'	Stadium: Fratton Park; Attendance: 20,381; Referee: David Webb

8 February 2025 31	Sheffield United	2–1	Portsmouth	Sheffield
15:00 GMT	Hamer 24'; Brereton (yellow card) 42'; Rak-Sakyi 73'; Clarke (yellow card) 77'; Peck (yellow card) 86'; Ahmedhodžić (yellow card) 90'	Report	Atkinson (yellow card) 25'; Ogilvie 27'	Stadium: Bramall Lane; Attendance: 29,104; Referee: Oliver Langford

11 February 2025 32	Portsmouth	2–1	Cardiff City	Portsmouth
19:45 GMT	Bishop 9'; Shaughnessy 17'; Lang (yellow card) 75'; Ogilvie (yellow card) 90+2'	Report	O'Dowda 22'; Goutas (yellow card) 76'; Salech (yellow card) 90+5'	Stadium: Fratton Park; Attendance: 20,251; Referee: Tom Nield

15 February 2025 33	Oxford United	0–2	Portsmouth	Oxford
13:00 GMT		Report	Dozzell (yellow card) 45+10' , (goal) 47'; O'Mahony (yellow card) 87' , (goal) 90+6'	Stadium: Kassam Stadium; Attendance: 11,423; Referee: Will Finnie
Note: Fixture was initially scheduled for a 15:00 kick-off, but was moved for live Sky Sports broadcasting. Kick-off then delayed by approximately 30 minutes due to Oxford spectator medical incident.

22 February 2025 34	Portsmouth	2–1	Queens Park Rangers	Portsmouth
15:00 GMT	Ogilvie (yellow card) 17'; Murphy 48'; Ritchie 51'; Poole (yellow card) 86'; Saydee (yellow card) 90+5'	Report	Frey (yellow card) 45+4'; Dunne 74'; Chair (yellow card) 90+7'	Stadium: Fratton Park; Attendance: 20,426; Referee: Thomas Bramall

1 March 2025 35	Luton Town	1–0	Portsmouth	Luton
15:00 GMT	Clark 25'; Brown (yellow card) 55'; Kaminski (yellow card) 90'	Report	Dozzell (yellow card) 5'; Ritchie (yellow card) 16'; Murphy (yellow card) 39'; Saydee (yellow card) 90+5'	Stadium: Kenilworth Road; Attendance: 11,662; Referee: Sam Allison

9 March 2025 36	Portsmouth	1–0	Leeds United	Portsmouth
12:00 GMT	Poole (yellow card) 43'; Bishop 61'; Potts (yellow card) 90+2'	Report		Stadium: Fratton Park; Attendance: 20,314; Referee: Robert Jones
Note: Fixture was initially scheduled for 8 March, but was moved for live Sky Sports broadcasting.

12 March 2025 37	Portsmouth	1–2	Plymouth Argyle	Portsmouth
19:45 GMT	Aouchiche 89'; Bramall (yellow card) 90+7'	Report	Bundu 44'; Hardie 49'; Sorinola (yellow card) 67' (yellow-red card) 86'; Gyabi (yellow card) 90+6'	Stadium: Fratton Park; Attendance: 20,394; Referee: Matt Donohue
Note: Fixture was initially scheduled for 11 March, but was moved due to a fixture on the preceding Sunday.

15 March 2025 38	Preston North End	2–1	Portsmouth	Preston
15:00 GMT	Frøkjær-Jensen (yellow card) 24'; Porteous 76'; Þórðarson 87'; Greenwood (yellow card) 90' (yellow-red card) 90+4'	Report	Bishop 83'; Waddingham (yellow card) 90+5'	Stadium: Deepdale; Attendance: 17,240; Referee: Tony Harrington

29 March 2025 39	Portsmouth	1–0	Blackburn Rovers	Portsmouth
15:00 GMT	Murphy 20'; Swanson (yellow card) 36'; Poole (yellow card) 37'; Williams (yellow card) 75'; Potts (yellow card) 81'	Report	Dolan (yellow card) 6'; Batth (yellow card) 40'	Stadium: Fratton Park; Attendance: 20,342; Referee: Jeremy Simpson

5 April 2025 40	Millwall	2–1	Portsmouth	Bermondsey
15:00 BST	Ivanović 57', 87'	Report	Devlin (yellow card) 29'; Bishop (yellow card) 59'; Ritchie (yellow card) 67'; Dozzell 80'; Pack (yellow card) 90+1'	Stadium: The Den; Attendance: 16,913; Referee: Ben Toner
Note: Fixture coincides with 127th 'birthday' anniversary of Portsmouth F.C.'s founding.

9 April 2025 41	Coventry City	1–0	Portsmouth	Coventry
20:00 BST	Paterson 90+4' (yellow card) 90+6'	Report	Murphy (yellow card) 37'; Ogilvie (yellow card) 69'; Bramall (yellow card) 90+2'	Stadium: Coventry Building Society Arena; Attendance: 28,411; Referee: Gavin Ward
Note: Fixture was initially scheduled for a 19:45 kick-off, but was moved for live Sky Sports broadcasting.

12 April 2025 42	Portsmouth	2–2	Derby County	Portsmouth
15:00 BST	Swanson (yellow card) 27'; Hayden (yellow card) 33'; Saydee (yellow card) 68'; Bishop (yellow card) 69'; Atkinson 71', 90+1', (yellow card) 80'	Report	Zetterström (yellow card) 6'; Clarke (yellow card) 21'; Mendez-Laing (yellow card) 34'; Adams (yellow card) 57'; Yates 70'; Atkinson 75' (o.g.)	Stadium: Fratton Park; Attendance: 20,412; Referee: Ruebyn Ricardo

18 April 2025 43	Norwich City	3–5	Portsmouth	Norwich
15:00 BST	Sargent 21'; Stacey 64'; Sainz (yellow card) 79'; Marcondes 90'	Report	Bishop 15', 45+4' (pen.), 51'; Ritchie (yellow card) 31', (goal) 39'; Hayden (yellow card) 32'; Poole 71'; Dozzell (yellow card) 90+5'	Stadium: Carrow Road; Attendance: 26,838; Referee: Thomas Kirk

21 April 2025 44	Portsmouth	1–0	Watford	Portsmouth
15:00 BST	Bishop 25', (yellow card) 27'; Aouchiche (yellow card) 44'; Potts (yellow card) 64'; Lang (yellow card) 90+5'	Report	Dwomoh (yellow card) 53'; Keben (red card) 57'; Louza (yellow card) 67'	Stadium: Fratton Park; Attendance: 20,451; Referee: Sam Allison

26 April 2025 45	Sheffield Wednesday	1–1	Portsmouth	Sheffield
15:00 BST	Paterson 9'; Ingelsson (yellow card) 90+1'	Report	Blair 23'; Shaughnessy (yellow card) 37'; Dozzell (yellow card) 67'	Stadium: Hillsborough Stadium; Attendance: 28,346; Referee: Leigh Doughty

3 May 2025 46	Portsmouth	1–1	Hull City	Portsmouth
12:30 BST	Saydee 55'	Report	McLoughlin (yellow card) 13'; Crooks 18', (yellow card) 44'	Stadium: Fratton Park; Attendance: 20,420; Referee: John Busby
Note: Fixture was initially scheduled for a 15:00 kick-off, but all EFL Championship final matchday fixtures were moved to an earlier kick-off.

=== FA Cup ===
Portsmouth joined the FA Cup on 10 January 2025 at the Third Round stage, and were knocked out by Wycombe Wanderers after losing 2-0.

Win Draw Loss Fixtures

10 January 2025 Third round	Wycombe Wanderers	2–0	Portsmouth	High Wycombe
19:45 GMT	Hanlan 17'; Bradley 27'; Harvie (yellow card) 63'	Report	Saydee (yellow card) 63'; Devlin (yellow card) 90+3'	Stadium: Adams Park; Attendance: 5,240; Referee: Tom Reeves

=== EFL Cup ===
On 27 June, the draw for the first round was made, with Portsmouth being knocked out on 13 August by Millwall after losing 0-1.

Win Draw Loss Fixtures

13 August 2024 First round	Portsmouth	0–1	Millwall	Portsmouth
19:45 BST	Whyte (yellow card) 45'; Lang (yellow card) 86'	Report	Esse 13'; Roberts (yellow card) 81'	Stadium: Fratton Park; Attendance: 13,913; Referee: Dean Whitestone

== Statistics ==
=== Appearances and goals ===
As of match(es) played 3 May 2025

Players with no appearances are not included on the list
Italics indicate a loaned in player

No.	Pos	Nat	Player	Total		Championship		FA Cup		EFL Cup	
No.	Pos	Nat	Player	Apps	Goals	Apps	Goals	Apps	Goals	Apps	Goals
2	DF	(England) ENG	Jordan Williams	22	0	16+4	0	1+0	0	1+0	0
3	DF	(England) ENG	Connor Ogilvie	46	4	45+0	4	0+0	0	1+0	0
4	DF	(England) ENG	Ryley Towler	14	1	10+2	1	0+1	0	1+0	0
5	DF	(Wales) WAL	Regan Poole	28	1	24+4	1	0+0	0	0+0	0
6	DF	(Republic of Ireland) IRL	Conor Shaughnessy	9	1	7+2	1	0+0	0	0+0	0
7	MF	(England) ENG	Marlon Pack	40	0	29+11	0	0+0	0	0+0	0
8	MF	(England) ENG	Freddie Potts	38	1	35+2	1	1+0	0	0+0	0
9	FW	(England) ENG	Colby Bishop	32	11	31+1	11	0+0	0	0+0	0
10	FW	(Australia) AUS	Kusini Yengi	14	0	4+10	0	0+0	0	0+0	0
11	FW	(Republic of Ireland) IRL	Mark O'Mahony	13	3	5+8	3	0+0	0	0+0	0
13	GK	(Austria) AUT	Nicolas Schmid	36	0	35+0	0	0+1	0	0+0	0
14	FW	(England) ENG	Kaide Gordon	5	0	0+5	0	0+0	0	0+0	0
15	FW	(England) ENG	Christian Saydee	31	3	10+19	3	1+0	0	1+0	0
16	DF	(Scotland) SCO	Tom McIntyre	13	0	11+1	0	1+0	0	0+0	0
17	MF	(France) FRA	Adil Aouchiche	12	1	9+3	1	0+0	0	0+0	0
18	DF	(England) ENG	Cohen Bramall	12	0	4+8	0	0+0	0	0+0	0
19	DF	(Australia) AUS	Jacob Farrell	1	0	1+0	0	0+0	0	0+0	0
20	FW	(Australia) AUS	Thomas Waddingham	5	1	1+4	1	0+0	0	0+0	0
21	MF	(England) ENG	Andre Dozzell	41	2	32+7	2	0+1	0	0+1	0
22	DF	(England) ENG	Zak Swanson	32	1	23+7	1	0+1	0	1+0	0
23	FW	(England) ENG	Josh Murphy	42	7	40+2	7	0+0	0	0+0	0
24	MF	(Northern Ireland) NIR	Terry Devlin	36	0	13+21	0	1+0	0	1+0	0
25	MF	(Guinea) GUI	Abdoulaye Kamara	6	0	0+5	0	1+0	0	0+0	0
26	MF	(England) ENG	Tom Lowery	1	0	0+0	0	0+0	0	1+0	0
29	FW	(England) ENG	Harvey Blair	12	1	3+9	1	0+0	0	0+0	0
30	MF	(Scotland) SCO	Matt Ritchie	41	5	28+11	5	1+0	0	0+1	0
31	GK	(Scotland) SCO	Jordan Archer	3	0	1+1	0	1+0	0	0+0	0
32	FW	(Northern Ireland) NIR	Paddy Lane	23	1	12+9	1	1+0	0	0+1	0
35	DF	(England) ENG	Robert Atkinson	15	2	13+1	2	1+0	0	0+0	0
36	GK	(England) ENG	Ben Killip	2	0	2+0	0	0+0	0	0+0	0
41	MF	(England) ENG	Harry Clout	1	0	0+0	0	0+1	0	0+0	0
44	DF	(Australia) AUS	Hayden Matthews	6	0	3+3	0	0+0	0	0+0	0
45	MF	(Jamaica) JAM	Issac Hayden	17	0	12+5	0	0+0	0	0+0	0
49	FW	(England) ENG	Callum Lang	33	10	28+4	10	0+0	0	0+1	0
Player(s) who featured whilst on loan but returned to parent club during the season:
20	FW	(Australia) AUS	Samuel Silvera	12	0	5+6	0	0+0	0	1+0	0
Player(s) who featured but departed permanently during the season:
1	GK	(England) ENG	Will Norris	9	0	8+0	0	0+0	0	1+0	0
11	FW	(Northern Ireland) NIR	Gavin Whyte	1	0	0+0	0	0+0	0	1+0	0
14	MF	(England) ENG	Ben Stevenson	2	0	0+1	0	0+0	0	1+0	0
17	MF	(England) ENG	Owen Moxon	13	0	2+10	0	1+0	0	0+0	0
18	FW	(Denmark) DEN	Elias Sørensen	13	1	4+8	1	0+0	0	0+1	0

=== Disciplinary record ===
As of 3 May 2025

Players with no cards are not included on the list
Italics indicate a loaned in player

No.	Pos	Nat	Player	Total		Championship		FA Cup		EFL Cup	
No.	Pos	Nat	Player	Yellow card	Red card	Yellow card	Red card	Yellow card	Red card	Yellow card	Red card
2	DF	(England) ENG	Jordan Williams	6	0	6	0	0	0	0	0
3	DF	(England) ENG	Connor Ogilvie	5	0	5	0	0	0	0	0
4	DF	(England) ENG	Ryley Towler	3	0	3	0	0	0	0	0
5	DF	(Wales) WAL	Regan Poole	5	0	5	0	0	0	0	0
6	DF	(Republic of Ireland) IRL	Conor Shaughnessy	2	0	2	0	0	0	0	0
7	MF	(England) ENG	Marlon Pack	8	1	8	1	0	0	0	0
8	MF	(England) ENG	Freddie Potts	7	0	7	0	0	0	0	0
9	FW	(England) ENG	Colby Bishop	3	0	3	0	0	0	0	0
10	FW	(Australia) AUS	Kusini Yengi	2	0	2	0	0	0	0	0
11	FW	(Republic of Ireland) IRL	Mark O'Mahony	1	0	1	0	0	0	0	0
13	GK	(Austria) AUT	Nicolas Schmid	1	0	1	0	0	0	0	0
15	FW	(England) ENG	Christian Saydee	6	0	5	0	1	0	0	0
16	DF	(Scotland) SCO	Tom McIntyre	3	0	3	0	0	0	0	0
17	MF	(France) FRA	Adil Aouchiche	2	0	2	0	0	0	0	0
18	DF	(England) ENG	Cohen Bramall	2	0	2	0	0	0	0	0
20	FW	(Australia) AUS	Thomas Waddingham	1	0	1	0	0	0	0	0
21	MF	(England) ENG	Andre Dozzell	11	0	11	0	0	0	0	0
22	DF	(England) ENG	Zak Swanson	5	0	5	0	0	0	0	0
23	FW	(England) ENG	Josh Murphy	6	0	6	0	0	0	0	0
24	MF	(Northern Ireland) NIR	Terry Devlin	3	0	2	0	1	0	0	0
25	MF	(Guinea) GUI	Abdoulaye Kamara	2	0	2	0	0	0	0	0
29	FW	(England) ENG	Harvey Blair	3	0	3	0	0	0	0	0
30	MF	(Scotland) SCO	Matt Ritchie	7	0	7	0	0	0	0	0
32	FW	(Northern Ireland) NIR	Paddy Lane	2	0	2	0	0	0	0	0
35	DF	(England) ENG	Robert Atkinson	4	0	4	0	0	0	0	0
45	MF	(Jamaica) JAM	Isaac Hayden	2	0	2	0	0	0	0	0
49	FW	(England) ENG	Callum Lang	11	0	10	0	0	0	1	0
Player(s) who were carded but departed permanently during the season:
1	GK	(England) ENG	Will Norris	3	0	3	0	0	0	0	0
11	FW	(Northern Ireland) NIR	Gavin Whyte	1	0	0	0	0	0	1	0
17	MF	(England) ENG	Owen Moxon	3	0	3	0	0	0	0	0
Squad Total				120	1	116	1	2	0	2	0
