= Dockerill =

Dockerill is an English surname. Notable people with the surname include:

- Josh Dockerill (born 2004), English footballer
- Julia Lopez (politician) (née Dockerill; born 1984), British politician, Member of Parliament
- Marian Dockerill, a pen name used by William Seabrook (1884–1945), American author and journalist
- Sylvia Dockerill (born 1951), Canadian swimmer

== Fictional characters ==
- Christopher Dockerill, a character in Call the Midwife
