= Nicolas Schmid =

Austrian footballer (born 1997)

Personal information
- Full name: Nicolas Schmid
- Date of birth: 22 February 1997 (age 29)
- Place of birth: Linz, Austria
- Height: 1.95 m (6 ft 5 in)
- Position: Goalkeeper

Team information
- Current team: Portsmouth
- Number: 1

Youth career
- 2004–2007: DSG Union Pichling
- 2007–2011: FC Juniors OÖ
- 2011–2015: LASK

Senior career*
Years	Team	Apps	(Gls)
2015–2018	FC Juniors OÖ	51	(0)
2016–2019	LASK	0	(0)
2018–2019	→ Blau-Weiß Linz (loan)	1	(0)
2019–2024	Blau-Weiß Linz	130	(0)
2024–	Portsmouth	74	(0)
- * Club domestic league appearances and goals as of 22:49, 14 October 2026 (UTC)

Nicolas Schmid (born 22 February 1997) is an Austrian professional footballer who plays as a goalkeeper for EFL Championship club Portsmouth.

== Club career ==
Growing up, Schmid first played for DSG Union Pichling before signing for FC Juniors OÖ who later became part of the youth setup with LASK. He went on for FC Juniors OÖ in the Austrian Regionalliga before joining Blau-Weiß Linz in 2018.

=== Blau-Weiß Linz ===
Schmidt made his debut for Blau-Weiß in their penalty shootout loss to ATSV Stadl-Paura in the first round of the ÖFB-Cup on 20 July 2018. In the league, he served as back-up goalkeeper to Ammar Helac during his first season, making one appearance in the 2. Liga against Austria Wien II on 26 October. He continued to sit on the bench until the season paused for the COVID-19 pandemic, but replaced Helac as starting goalkeeper for the final eleven fixtures when the league resumed in June 2020.

In his first full season as first choice goalkeeper, Schmidt helped Blau-Weiß to win the 2. Liga title, keeping twelve clean sheets from 28 matches. As the club did not apply for an Austrian Bundesliga licence, they remained in the 2. Liga for the 2021–22 season. After a third-placed finish in 2021–22 season, Blau-Weiß won a second 2. Liga title in the 2022–23 season, gaining promotion to the Bundesliga.

Schmid made his Austrian Bundesliga debut on 29 July 2023, playing a 2–1 loss to Wolfsberger AC. He kept his first clean sheet in the competition in a 1–0 win at champions RB Salzburg on 23 September.

Schmidt began the 2024–25 Austrian Bundesliga season with a clean sheet in a 1–0 win over Austria Wien on 4 August 2024.

=== Portsmouth ===
On 21 August 2024, Schmid joined Championship side Portsmouth for an undisclosed fee, signing a two-year deal.

After sitting on the bench for five matches, Schmidt replaced Will Norris for a home match against Oxford United on 5 October. He retained his place in the starting line-up for the following match against Queens Park Rangers which Portsmouth won 2–1, giving them their first win since returning to the Championship. He ended the season with eight clean sheets from 35 Championship matches and was voted in third place for Portsmouth's Player of the Season award.

Schmid broke his hand in the South Coast derby in September 2025, during a collision with teammate Connor Ogilvie and opponent Tom Fellows. He returned from injury on 22 November in a 3–1 win over Millwall at Fratton Park.

== International career ==
Schmid has represented Austria at youth level. Schmid has had a recent call-up to Austria.

== Career statistics ==
As of match played 14 October 2026

Appearances and goals by club, season and competition
Club	Season	League			National cup		League cup		Other		Total	
Club	Season	Division	Apps	Goals	Apps	Goals	Apps	Goals	Apps	Goals	Apps	Goals
FC Juniors OÖ	2015–16	Austrian Regionalliga	17	0	—		—		—		17	0
FC Juniors OÖ	2016–17	Austrian Regionalliga	18	0	—		—		—		18	0
FC Juniors OÖ	2017–18	Austrian Regionalliga	16	0	—		—		—		16	0
FC Juniors OÖ	Total		51	0	0	0	0	0	0	0	51	0
Blau-Weiß Linz	2018–19	Austrian 2. Liga	1	0	1	0	—		—		2	0
Blau-Weiß Linz	2019–20	Austrian 2. Liga	11	0	1	0	—		—		12	0
Blau-Weiß Linz	2020–21	Austrian 2. Liga	28	0	1	0	—		—		21	0
Blau-Weiß Linz	2021–22	Austrian 2. Liga	29	0	0	0	—		—		29	0
Blau-Weiß Linz	2022–23	Austrian 2. Liga	29	0	3	0	—		—		32	0
Blau-Weiß Linz	2023–24	Austrian Bundesliga	31	0	1	0	—		—		32	0
Blau-Weiß Linz	2024–25	Austrian Bundesliga	2	0	1	0	—		—		3	0
Blau-Weiß Linz	Total		131	0	8	0	0	0	0	0	139	0
Portsmouth	2024–25	EFL Championship	35	0	1	0	0	0	—		36	0
Portsmouth	2025–26	EFL Championship	34	0	0	0	0	0	—		34	0
Portsmouth	2026–27	EFL Championship	5	0	0	0	1	0	—		6	0
Portsmouth	Total		74	0	1	0	1	0	0	0	76	0
Career total			256	0	9	0	1	0	0	0	269	0

== Honours ==
Blau-Weiß Linz

- Austrian 2. Liga winner: 2016–17, 2020–21, 2022–23
