= Alex Robertson (soccer, born 2003) =

Professional footballer (born 2003)

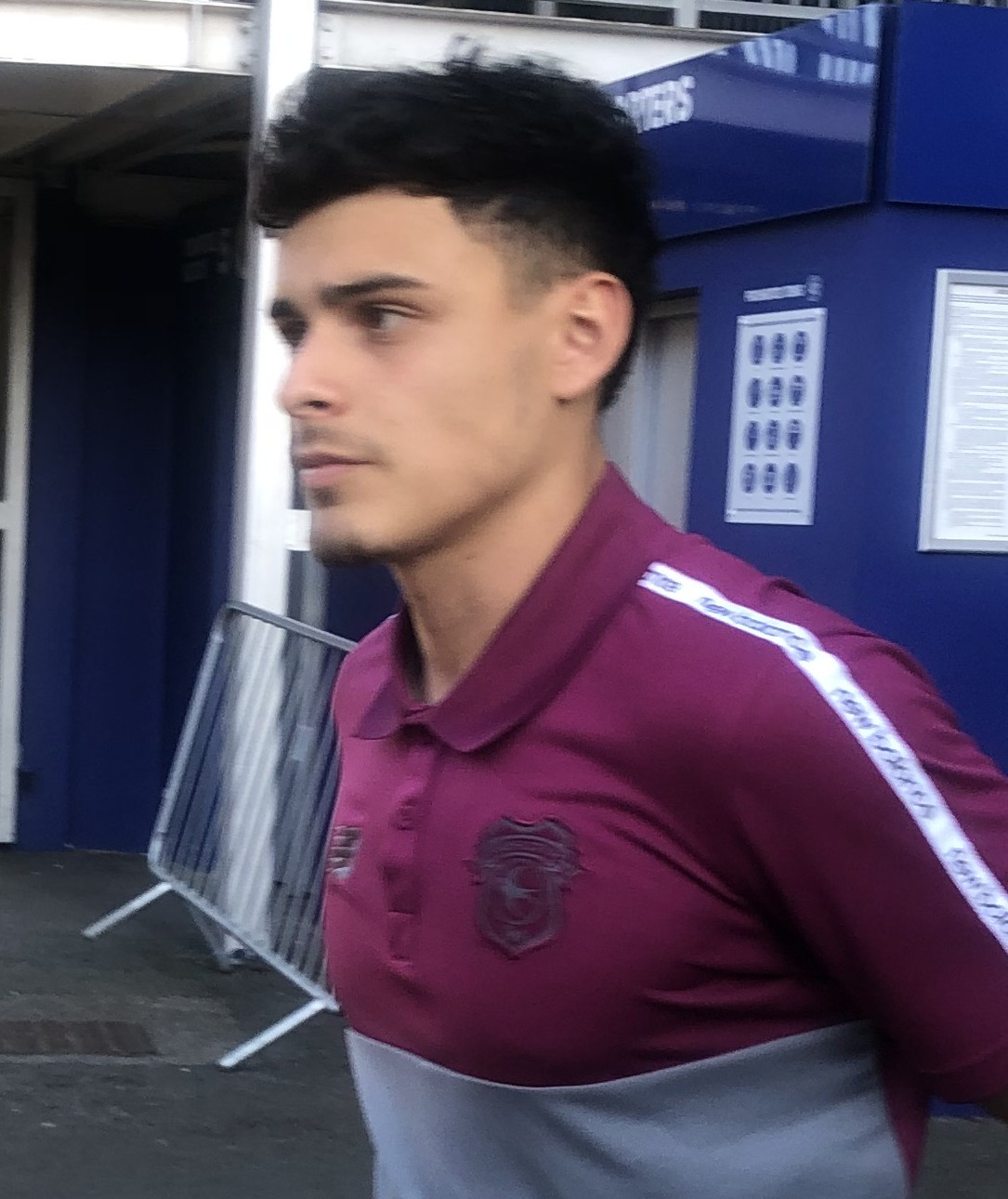
- Robertson with Cardiff City in 2025

Personal information
- Full name: Alexander Sean Pablo Robertson
- Date of birth: 17 April 2003 (age 23)
- Place of birth: Dundee, Scotland
- Height: 1.82 m (6 ft 0 in)
- Position: Central midfielder

Team information
- Current team: Cardiff City
- Number: 18

Youth career
- Pagewood Botany
- Maroubra United
- 2013–2015: Hakoah Sydney City East
- 2015–2017: Manchester United
- 2017–2021: Manchester City

Senior career*
Years	Team	Apps	(Gls)
2021–2024	Manchester City	0	(0)
2021–2022	→ Ross County (loan)	3	(0)
2023–2024	→ Portsmouth (loan)	23	(1)
2024–	Cardiff City	86	(10)

International career^{‡}
- Australia U15
- England U16
2019	England U17	2	(2)
2021	England U18	1	(0)
- Australia U19
2023–	Australia	3	(0)
- * Club domestic league appearances and goals as of 09:13, 22 November 2026 (UTC) ‡ National team caps and goals as of 31 March 2026

Alexander Sean Pablo Robertson (born 17 April 2003) is a professional footballer who plays as a central midfielder for EFL Championship club Cardiff City. Born in Scotland, he represents the Australia national team.

== Early life ==
Robertson was born in Dundee, Scotland to a Peruvian mother and Australian father, Mark, who played football professionally. He moved to his father's native Australia at the age of four, where he lived in the Sydney suburb of Maroubra between the ages of five and twelve.

== Club career ==
=== Early career ===
Robertson took an interest in sports from an early age, but due to children in Australia not being insured to play football until they turned five at the time, his father enrolled him in local rugby league club Mascot Jets. He also spent time at Bunnerong Gymnastics, a venue run by his grandparents, to improve his balance, before joining local football side Pagewood Botany.

He spent time with Maroubra United and the Mr. Soccer Academy, run by his father Mark, before joining the academy of Hakoah Sydney City East at the age of ten.

In September 2015, he trialled with English club Manchester United, and his family moved to England to facilitate the move. Due to FIFA rules, Robertson was initially unable to play structured football with Manchester United, and had to train in a local park with his father to keep up his fitness. He stayed with Manchester United for 2 years.

=== Manchester City ===
After leaving Manchester United for rivals Manchester City at under-15 level, Robertson rose quickly through the youth ranks to establish himself as a top young prospect, and was included in The Guardian's "Next Generation" list for 2020.

He made one appearance in the EFL Trophy in the 2020–21 season, in a 2–1 loss to Tranmere Rovers.

Despite numerous injuries, Robertson was involved in first-team training on a regular basis, citing fellow midfielder Fernandinho as a mentor.

==== Loan to Ross County ====
On 5 July 2021, Robertson joined Scottish club Ross County on a season-long loan, with manager Malky Mackay stating that he had been tracking the young midfielder "for four years".

He made his debut for Ross County on 21 July 2021, in a 1–0 Scottish League Cup win over Brora Rangers, coming on as a 66th-minute substitute for fellow loanee Jake Vokins.

Robertson returned to Manchester City early in January 2022.

==== Loan to Portsmouth ====
On 7 August 2023 he moved on loan to Portsmouth. In January 2024, Robertson was ruled out for the remainder of the 2023–24 season having torn his hamstring attempting a backheel in training.

=== Cardiff City ===
On 7 August 2024, Robertson signed for Championship club Cardiff City on a four-year contract. The initial fee was reported to be just under £1 million with the potential to rise to £3 million should all add-ons be met.

Robertson was injured during pre-season ahead of the 2025–26 season, but after returning to fitness was unable to break back into the first-team, being urged by manager Brian Barry-Murphy to "do more".

== International career ==
Robertson is eligible to represent Australia through his father, Scotland through birth, Peru through his mother, and England, having lived there for most of his teen life. He has represented Australia and England at youth international level. On 14 March 2023, he was called to represent the Australia men's national soccer team for two friendly matches against Ecuador and made his debut, from the bench on 24 March 2023, becoming the first third-generation international for Australia in the process.

In October 2025, Robertson was recalled to the Australia national team, for the first time since October 2023.

== Personal life ==
Robertson is the son of former Australian international soccer player Mark Robertson. His uncle is former Scotland international Gavin Rae.

His grandfather, Alex, represented an Australia team in eight unofficial international matches 1984.

== Career statistics ==
=== Club ===
As of match played 21 November 2026

Appearances and goals by club, season and competition
Club	Season	League			National cup		League cup		Other		Total	
Club	Season	Division	Apps	Goals	Apps	Goals	Apps	Goals	Apps	Goals	Apps	Goals
Manchester City U23	2020–21	–							1 (Note: Appearance in EFL Trophy)	0	1	0
Manchester City	2021–22	Premier League	0	0	0	0	0	0	0	0	0	0
Manchester City	2022–23	Premier League	0	0	0	0	0	0	0	0	0	0
Manchester City	2023–24	Premier League	0	0	0	0	0	0	0	0	0	0
Manchester City	Total		0	0	0	0	0	0	0	0	0	0
Ross County (loan)	2021–22	Scottish Premiership	3	0	0	0	2	0	–		5	0
Portsmouth (loan)	2023–24	League One	23	1	1	0	2	0	1	0	27	1
Cardiff City	2024–25	Championship	35	3	2	0	2	1	0	0	39	4
Cardiff City	2025–26	League One	34	6	1	0	2	0	0	0	37	6
Cardiff City	2026–27	Championship	16	1	0	0	2	0	—		18	1
Cardiff City	Total		86	10	3	0	6	1	0	0	94	11
Career total			111	11	4	0	10	1	2	0	127	12

=== International ===
As of match played 31 March 2026

Appearances and goals by national team and year
National team	Year	Apps	Goals
Australia	2023	2	0
Australia	2024	0	0
Australia	2025	0	0
Australia	2026	1	0
Total		3	0

== Honours ==
Portsmouth

- EFL League One: 2023–24
