= 2023–24 Portsmouth F.C. season =

Portsmouth
2023–24 season
- Owner-Chairman: Michael Eisner
- Chief Executive Officer: Andrew Cullen
- Head coach: John Mousinho
- Stadium: Fratton Park
- League One: 1st (97 points)
- FA Cup: First round
- EFL Cup: Second round
- EFL Trophy: Second round
- Top goalscorer: League: Colby Bishop (21); All: Colby Bishop (21)
- Highest home attendance: 20,303 vs. Oxford Utd (2 March 2024)
- Lowest home attendance: 17,450 vs. Wycombe Wanderers (3 October 2023)
- Biggest win: 4–0 vs. Leyton Orient (A); 12 August 2023
- Biggest defeat: 0–4 vs. Blackpool (H); 25 November 2023
Home colours	Away colours	Third colours

The 2023–24 season was Portsmouth's seventh consecutive season in League One and celebrated as their 125th anniversary as a football club. In addition to the domestic league, Portsmouth also competed in the FA Cup, the EFL Cup, and the EFL Trophy.

On 16 April 2024, Portsmouth were crowned champions of EFL League One and were promoted to the EFL Championship. The EFL League One champions trophy was presented at Fratton Park on 20 April 2024 after the conclusion of the final home game of the season against Wigan.

== Players ==
=== Squad ===
As of 16 March 2024

Note: Flags indicate national team as defined under FIFA eligibility rules; some limited exceptions apply. Players may hold more than one non-FIFA nationality.

No.	Pos.	Nation	Player
1	GK	ENG	Will Norris
2	DF	ENG	Zak Swanson
4	DF	ENG	Ryley Towler
5	DF	WAL	Regan Poole
6	DF	ENG	Connor Ogilvie
7	MF	ENG	Marlon Pack (captain)
8	MF	AUS	Alex Robertson (on loan from Manchester City)
9	FW	ENG	Colby Bishop
10	FW	IRL	Anthony Scully
11	FW	NIR	Gavin Whyte
13	GK	ENG	Matt Macey
14	MF	ENG	Ben Stevenson
15	FW	ENG	Christian Saydee
16	MF	WAL	Joe Morrell
17	DF	IRL	Joe Rafferty
18	DF	IRL	Conor Shaughnessy

No.	Pos.	Nation	Player
19	FW	AUS	Kusini Yengi
20	DF	ENG	Sean Raggett
21	DF	ENG	Jack Sparkes
23	MF	ENG	Owen Moxon
24	MF	NIR	Terry Devlin
25	FW	ENG	Abu Kamara (on loan from Norwich)
26	MF	ENG	Tom Lowery
28	MF	ENG	Tino Anjorin (on loan from Chelsea)
29	FW	ENG	Josh Martin
31	GK	ENG	Ryan Schofield
32	FW	NIR	Paddy Lane
34	DF	ENG	Josh Dockerill
44	FW	ENG	Myles Peart-Harris (on loan from Brentford)
45	MF	WAL	Lee Evans
46	DF	SCO	Tom McIntyre
49	FW	ENG	Callum Lang

== Transfers ==
=== In ===
No.	Pos.	Player	Transferred From	Fee	Date	Source
15	FW	(England) Christian Saydee	(England) Bournemouth	Undisclosed	14 June 2023	
24	MF	(Northern Ireland) Terry Devlin	(Northern Ireland) Glentoran	Undisclosed	15 June 2023	
10	FW	(Republic of Ireland) Anthony Scully	(England) Wigan Athletic	Undisclosed	16 June 2023	
1	GK	(England) Will Norris	(England) Burnley	Free Transfer	1 July 2023	
18	DF	(Republic of Ireland) Conor Shaughnessy	(England) Burton Albion	Free Transfer	1 July 2023	
21	DF	(England) Jack Sparkes	(England) Exeter City	Free Transfer	1 July 2023	
14	MF	(England) Ben Stevenson	(England) Forest Green Rovers	Free Transfer	1 July 2023	
11	FW	(Northern Ireland) Gavin Whyte	(Wales) Cardiff City	Free Transfer	1 July 2023	
19	FW	(Australia) Kusini Yengi	(Australia) Western Sydney Wanderers	Undisclosed	2 July 2023	
5	DF	(Wales) Regan Poole	(England) Lincoln City	Free Transfer	10 July 2023	
31	GK	(England) Ryan Schofield	(England) Huddersfield Town	Free Transfer	26 July 2023	
29	FW	(England) Josh Martin	Free agent	—N/a	13 November 2023	
13	GK	(England) Matt Macey	Free agent	—N/a	12 January 2024	
49	FW	(England) Callum Lang	(England) Wigan Athletic	Undisclosed	29 January 2024	
46	DF	(Scotland) Tom McIntyre	(England) Reading	Undisclosed	30 January 2024	
23	MF	(England) Owen Moxon	(England) Carlisle United	Undisclosed	31 January 2024	
45	MF	(Wales) Lee Evans	(England) Ipswich Town	Free Transfer	1 March 2024	

=== Out ===
No.	Pos.	Player	Transferred to	Fee	Date	Source
18	FW	(Saint Lucia) Reeco Hackett	(England) Lincoln City	Undisclosed	14 June 2023	
31	MF	(Malta) Alfie Bridgman	(England) Eastbourne Borough	End of Contract	30 June 2023	
11	FW	(Republic of Ireland) Ronan Curtis	Unattached	End of Contract	30 June 2023	
13	DF	(Wales) Kieron Freeman	(England) Oldham Athletic	End of Contract	30 June 2023	
32	FW	(England) Dan Gifford	(England) Farnborough	End of Contract	30 June 2023	
-	FW	(England) Jamie Howell	Unattached	End of Contract	30 June 2023	
24	MF	(England) Michael Jacobs	(England) Chesterfield	End of Contract	30 June 2023	
25	MF	(England) Jay Mingi	(England) Colchester United	End of Contract	30 June 2023	
-	MF	(England) Adam Payce	(England) Farnborough	End of Contract	30 June 2023	
14	FW	(England) Jayden Reid	Unattached	End of Contract	30 June 2023	
4	DF	(Scotland) Clark Robertson	(Israel) F.C. Ashdod	End of Contract	30 June 2023	
-	MF	(England) Elliott Simpson	Unattached	End of Contract	30 June 2023	
23	MF	(Wales) Louis Thompson	(England) Stevenage	End of Contract	30 June 2023	
8	MF	(England) Ryan Tunnicliffe	(Australia) Adelaide United	End of Contract	30 June 2023	
13	GK	(Nigeria) Josh Oluwayemi	(Finland) FC Lahti	Undisclosed	11 January 2024	
23	DF	(England) Denver Hume	(England) Grimsby Town	Free Transfer	1 February 2024	

=== Loaned in ===
No.	Pos.	Player	Loaned From	Until	Date	Source
25	FW	(England) Abu Kamara	(England) Norwich City	End of Season	19 July 2023	
8	MF	(Australia) Alex Robertson	(England) Manchester City	End of Season	7 August 2023	
28	MF	(England) Tino Anjorin	(England) Chelsea	End of Season	31 August 2023	
44	MF	(England) Myles Peart-Harris	(England) Brentford	End of Season	22 January 2024	

=== Loaned out ===
No.	Pos.	Player	Loaned to	Until	Date	Source
-	FW	(Republic of Ireland) Sam Folarin	(England) Poole Town	31 December 2023	20 July 2023	
-	DF	(England) Harvey Laidlaw	(England) Gosport Borough	31 December 2023	20 July 2023	
-	FW	(England) Destiny Ojo	(England) Poole Town	31 December 2023	20 July 2023	
30	MF	(Wales) Harry Jewitt-White	(England) Havant & Waterlooville	End of Season	1 August 2023	
-	DF	(Tanzania) Haji Mnoga	(England) Aldershot Town	End of Season	2 August 2023	
33	GK	(England) Toby Steward	(England) Gosport Borough	1 January 2024	3 August 2023	
22	MF	(England) Liam Vincent	(England) Worthing	7 September 2023	10 August 2023	
22	MF	(England) Liam Vincent	(England) Tonbridge Angels	17 February 2024	20 January 2024	
-	FW	(Republic of Ireland) Sam Folarin	(England) Bognor Regis Town	29 February 2024	28 March 2024	

== Pre-season and friendlies ==
On 17 May, Pompey announced their pre-season schedule, with matches against Bristol City, Bognor Regis Town, Gosport Borough and Havant & Waterlooville confirmed along with a training camp in southern Spain between 2–7 July. A day later, the club confirmed a trip to AFC Wimbledon. On 12 June, a friendly during their training camp was confirmed, against Europa.

Win Draw Loss Fixtures

6 July 2023 Friendly	Portsmouth	1–0	Europa	Coín, Spain
18:30 CEST; 17:30 BST	Bishop 6' (pen.)	Report		Stadium: Estadio Jose Burgos De Quintana

11 July 2023 Friendly	Bognor Regis Town	1–1	Portsmouth	Bognor Regis
19:45 BST	Trialist 87'	Report	Morrell 75' (pen.)	Stadium: Nyewood Lane; Referee: Dan Austin

14 July 2023 Friendly	Gosport Borough	1–3	Portsmouth	Gosport
19:00 BST	Ramos 24'	Report	Morrell 29'; Jewitt-White 90'; Ojo 90+1'	Stadium: The AEI Stadium; Attendance: 2,250; Referee: Anthony Cross

15 July 2023 Friendly	Havant & Waterlooville	0–1	Portsmouth	Havant
13:00 BST		Report	Ojo 43'	Stadium: Draper Tools Community Stadium; Attendance: 4,250; Referee: Matt Russell

22 July 2023 Friendly	Portsmouth	9–1	Crawley Town	Portsmouth
15:00 BST	Swanson 18'; Bishop 49'; Scully 69', 110'; Lowery 88'; Yengi 92', 101', 114'; Saydee 112'	Report		Stadium: Copnor Road; Attendance: 0 (behind closed doors); Referee: Dean Treleaven

25 July 2023 Friendly	AFC Wimbledon	1–0	Portsmouth	Wimbledon
19:00 BST	Stevenson 27' (o.g.)	Report		Stadium: Plough Lane; Attendance: 3,047 (1,215 Pompey fans); Referee: Craig Hicks

29 July 2023 Friendly	Portsmouth	0–1	Bristol City	Portsmouth
15:00 BST		Report	Sykes 50'	Stadium: Fratton Park; Attendance: 7,986 (1,802 away fans); Referee: Sunny Gill

== Competitions ==
=== Overall record ===
Competition	Starting round	Final position	Record							
Competition	Starting round	Final position	Pld	W	D	L	GF	GA	GD	Win %
EFL League One	Matchday 1	Champions	46	28	13	5	78	41	+37	60.87
FA Cup	First round	First round	1	0	0	1	0	1	−1	0.00
EFL Cup	First round	Second round	2	1	1	0	4	1	+3	50.00
EFL Trophy	Group stage	Second round	4	2	1	1	12	10	+2	50.00
Total			53	31	15	7	94	53	+41	58.49

Last updated: 27 April 2024
Source: Soccerway

=== EFL League One ===
==== League table ====
Pos	Team	Pld	W	D	L	GF	GA	GD	Pts	Promotion, qualification or relegation
1	Portsmouth (C, P)	46	28	13	5	78	41	+37	97	Promotion to EFL Championship
2	Derby County (P)	46	28	8	10	78	37	+41	92	Promotion to EFL Championship
3	Bolton Wanderers	46	25	12	9	86	51	+35	87	Qualification for League One play-offs
4	Peterborough United	46	25	9	12	89	61	+28	84	Qualification for League One play-offs
5	Oxford United (O, P)	46	22	11	13	79	56	+23	77	Qualification for League One play-offs
6	Barnsley	46	21	13	12	82	64	+18	76	Qualification for League One play-offs

Source: EFL Official Website
Rules for classification: 1) Points; 2) Goal difference; 3) Number of goals scored; 4) Head-to-head results; 5) Wins; 6) Away goals; 7) Penalty points (sec 9.5); 8) 12-point sending off offences
(C) Champions; (O) Play-off winners; (P) Promoted

==== Results summary ====
Overall								Home						Away					
Pld	W	D	L	GF	GA	GD	Pts	W	D	L	GF	GA	GD	W	D	L	GF	GA	GD
46	28	13	5	78	41	+37	97	15	5	3	43	27	+16	13	8	2	35	14	+21

Last updated: 27 April 2024.
Source: Soccerway

==== Results by round ====
Round	1	2	3	4	5	6	8	7^{1}	9	10	11	12	14	15	16	17	19	20	13^{2}	21	22	23	24	25	26	27	28	29	30	18^{3}	31	32	33	34	35	36	37	38	39	41	42	43	44	40^{4}	45	46
Ground	H	A	H	H	A	H	A	A	H	A	H	H	H	A	A	H	H	A	A	H	A	H	A	A	H	A	H	A	A	A	H	A	H	H	A	H	A	H	A	A	H	H	A	H	H	A
Result	D	W	W	D	D	W	D	W	W	W	W	W	W	D	W	D	L	W	W	W	W	D	L	D	W	L	L	W	W	D	W	W	W	W	D	W	D	W	W	W	D	W	D	W	L	W
Position	13	6	4	6	7	5	6	1	1	1	1	1	1	1	1	1	2	2	1	1	1	1	1	1	1	1	1	1	1	1	1	1	1	1	1	1	1	1	1	1	1	1	1	1	1	1

Updated to match(es) played on 27 April 2024. Source: Soccerway
A = Away; H = Home; W = Win; D = Draw; L = Loss; P = Postponed
Notes:
- ^{1} Matchday 7 (vs Barnsley) was postponed due to the international call-ups.
- ^{2} Matchday 13 (vs Northampton Town) was postponed due to the international call-ups.
- ^{3} Matchday 18 (vs Oxford United) was postponed due to the international call-ups.
- ^{4} Matchday 40 (vs Barnsley) was postponed due to the international call-ups.

==== Matches ====
On 22 June, the EFL League One fixtures were released.

Win Draw Loss Fixtures

5 August 2023 1	Portsmouth	1–1	Bristol Rovers	Portsmouth
15:00 BST	Morrell (yellow card) 16'; Lowery (yellow card) 17'; Towler (yellow card) 45+5'; Poole (yellow card) 64'; Yengi 90+2'	Report	Finley (yellow card) 9'; Thomas 24'; Wilson (yellow card) 35'; Hoole (yellow card) 42'	Stadium: Fratton Park; Attendance: 19,165; Referee: Sam Allison

12 August 2023 2	Leyton Orient	0–4	Portsmouth	Leyton
15:00 BST	Hunt (yellow card) 50'	Report	Pack 23'; Bishop 44'; Beckles 51' (o.g.); Robertson (yellow card) 68'; Yengi 90+3'	Stadium: Brisbane Road; Attendance: 8,372; Referee: Ollie Yates

15 August 2023 3	Portsmouth	1–0	Exeter City	Portsmouth
19:45 BST	Poole (yellow card) 51'; Bishop 70'; Sparkes (yellow card) 74'; Robertson (yellow card) 79'; Ogilvie (yellow card) 89'; Shaughnessy (yellow card) 90'	Report	Hartridge (yellow card) 44'	Stadium: Fratton Park; Attendance: 17,592; Referee: Tom Reeves

19 August 2023 4	Portsmouth	0–0	Cheltenham Town	Portsmouth
15:00 BST		Report	Sercombe (yellow card) 30'; Thompson (yellow card) 54'; Southwood (yellow card) 84'	Stadium: Fratton Park; Attendance: 17,454; Referee: Ben Toner

25 August 2023 5	Stevenage	0–0	Portsmouth	Stevenage
15:00 BST	Thompson L. (yellow card) 22'; Forster-Caskey (red card) 55'; Reid (yellow card) 62'; Ashby-Hammond (yellow card) 90+8'; List (yellow card) 90+10'	Report	Whyte (yellow card) 44'; Rafferty (red card) 56'; Kamara (yellow card) 69'; Swanson (yellow card) 90+11'	Stadium: Lamex Stadium; Attendance: 5,352; Referee: Simon Mather

2 September 2023 6	Portsmouth	3–1	Peterborough United	Portsmouth
15:00 BST	Bishop 38'; Kamara 43'; Poole (yellow card) 15', (goal) 59'; Morrell (yellow card) 64' (yellow-red card) 85'	Report	Jade-Jones 20'	Stadium: Fratton Park; Attendance: 17,814; Referee: David Rock

16 September 2023 8	Derby County	1–1	Portsmouth	Derby
15:00 BST	Fornah (yellow card) 26'; Collins 86' (pen.), (yellow card) 88'	Report	Pack (yellow card) 10'; Poole (yellow card) 28'; Robertson (yellow card) 65'; Bishop 90+5'	Stadium: Pride Park; Attendance: 27,999; Referee: Rebecca Welch

19 September 2023 7	Barnsley	2–3	Portsmouth	Barnsley
19:45 BST	Cotter 49'; Styles 77'	Report	Bishop 8' (pen.); Lane 8'; Ogilvie 16'; Rafferty (yellow card) 80'	Stadium: Oakwell Stadium; Attendance: 11,464; Referee: Lewis Smith
Note: Fixture was postponed from 9 September 2023 due to international call-ups.

23 September 2023 9	Portsmouth	2–1	Lincoln City	Portsmouth
15:00 BST	Lane 8'; Poole 45+3'; Robertson (yellow card) 60'; Morrell (yellow card) 71'; Pack (yellow card) 90+7'	Report	Adelakun 5'; Hackett (yellow card) 18'; Erhahon (yellow card) 71'	Stadium: Fratton Park; Attendance: 17,748; Referee: Paul Howard

30 September 2023 10	Wigan Athletic	1–2	Portsmouth	Wigan
15:00 BST	Aasgaard (yellow card) 9'; Godo 27'; Watts (yellow card) 45+3'; Wyke (red card) 49'; Clare (yellow card) 63'	Report	Poole 31'; Lane 37'; Kamara (yellow card) 78'; Morrell (yellow card) 90+1'	Stadium: DW Stadium; Attendance: 10,358; Referee: Will Finnie

3 October 2023 11	Portsmouth	2–1	Wycombe Wanderers	Portsmouth
19:45 BST	Bishop 58'; Robertson (yellow card) 63'; Poole (yellow card) 71'; Shaughnessy 90+8'	Report	Scowen (yellow card) 20', (goal) 22'; Leahy (yellow card) 40'; Hanlan (yellow card) 72'; Tafazolli (yellow card) 90+1'	Stadium: Fratton Park; Attendance: 17,450; Referee: Alan Young

7 October 2023 12	Portsmouth	2–0	Port Vale	Portsmouth
15:00 BST	Lane (yellow card) 52'; Bishop 53', 58' (pen.)	Report	Arblaster (yellow card) 45+2'; Balmer (yellow card) 57'; Lowe (yellow card) 68'	Stadium: Fratton Park; Attendance: 17,837; Referee: Bobby Madley

21 October 2023 14	Portsmouth	1–0	Carlisle United	Portsmouth
15:00 BST	Rafferty (yellow card) 78'; Shaughnessy 90+3'	Report	McCalmont (yellow card) 48'; Guy (yellow card) 70'; Garner (yellow card) 73'	Stadium: Fratton Park; Attendance: 17,911; Referee: Leigh Doughty

24 October 2023 15	Cambridge United	0–0	Portsmouth	Cambridge
19:45 GMT	Digby (yellow card) 76'	Report	Kamara (yellow card) 67'; Morrell (yellow card) 68'; Sparkes (yellow card) 77'; Shaughnessy (yellow card) 89'	Stadium: Abbey Stadium; Attendance: 6,627; Referee: Declan Bourne

28 October 2023 16	Reading	2–3	Portsmouth	Reading
15:00 BST	Wing 23', (yellow card) 45+5'; Savage 27'; Guinness-Walker (yellow card) 52'; Dean (yellow card) 82'; Elliott (yellow card) 90'	Report	Anjorin 33'; Bishop 45+9'; Devlin 58'; Robertson (yellow card) 60'; Saydee (yellow card) 89'	Stadium: Madjeski Stadium; Attendance: 14,417; Referee: Martin Coy

11 November 2023 17	Portsmouth	2–2	Charlton Athletic	Portsmouth
15:00 GMT	Kamara 31'; Bishop 75' (pen.)	Report	Edun (yellow card) 45+3'; Leaburn (yellow card) 69'; May 71'; McGrandles 90+3'; Hector (yellow card) 90+5'; Jones (yellow card) 90+8'	Stadium: Fratton Park; Attendance: 19,404; Referee: Sam Allison

25 November 2023 19	Portsmouth	0–4	Blackpool	Portsmouth
15:00 GMT	Lane (yellow card) 10'; Norris (yellow card) 56'; Morrell (yellow card) 58' (yellow-red card) 63'; Saydee (yellow card) 60'	Report	Dale 9'; Dougall (yellow card) 23'; Rhodes (yellow card) 52'; Grimshaw (yellow card) 55'; Beesley 56'; CJ Hamilton 74'; Morgan 87'	Stadium: Fratton Park; Attendance: 18,697; Referee: Ollie Yates

28 November 2023 20	Burton Albion	0–2	Portsmouth	Burton-upon-Trent
19:45 GMT	Baah (yellow card) 19'; Seddon (yellow card) 70' (yellow-red card) 90'	Report	Bishop 38' (pen.); Robertson 63'	Stadium: Pirelli Stadium; Attendance: 2,749; Referee: Scott Oldham

2 December 2023 13	Northampton Town	0–3	Portsmouth	Northampton
15:00 GMT	Bowie (yellow card) 47'	Report	Raggett 11'; Norris (yellow card) 22'; Lane 26', 48'	Stadium: Sixfields Stadium; Attendance: 7,215; Referee: Darren Drysdale
Note: Fixture was postponed from 14 October 2023 due to international call-ups.

11 December 2023 21	Portsmouth	2–0	Bolton Wanderers	Portsmouth
20:00 GMT	Robertson (yellow card) 10'; Sparkes (yellow card) 35'; Shaughnessy 45'; Rafferty (yellow card) 85'; Yengi 88'	Report	Thomason (yellow card) 14'; Sheehan (yellow card) 74'; Mendes Gomes (yellow card) 90+2'; Jones (yellow card) 90+5'	Stadium: Fratton Park; Attendance: 19,052; Referee: Paul Howard
Note: Fixture was rescheduled from 9 December 2023 for live Sky TV broadcast.

16 December 2023 22	Shrewsbury Town	0–3	Portsmouth	Shrewsbury
15:00 GMT		Report	Raggett (yellow card) 12'; Kamara 45+2', 84'; Pack 62'; Morrell (yellow card) 72'	Stadium: New Meadow; Attendance: 7,296; Referee: Lee Swabey

23 December 2023 23	Portsmouth	1–1	Fleetwood Town	Portsmouth
15:00 GMT	Bishop 45+3' (pen.); Saydee (yellow card) 69'; Scully (yellow card) 90+2'; Sparkes (yellow card) 90+5'	Report	Earl 63'; Dolan (yellow card) 70'	Stadium: Fratton Park; Attendance: 18,412; Referee: Tom Nield

26 December 2023 24	Bristol Rovers	2–1	Portsmouth	Bristol
15:00 GMT	Evans 66', (yellow card) 69'; Finley (yellow card) 80'; Thomas 90+4'	Report	Robertson (yellow card) 20'; Sparkes (yellow card) 48'; Morrell (yellow card) 65'; Raggett (yellow card) 69'; Lane 78'	Stadium: Memorial Stadium; Attendance: 9,176; Referee: Scott Tallis

29 December 2023 25	Exeter City	0–0	Portsmouth	Exeter
19:45 GMT	Carroll (yellow card) 79'	Report	Raggett (yellow card) 60'; Sparkes (yellow card) 71'	Stadium: St James Park; Attendance: 8,322; Referee: Sunny Sukhvir Gill

1 January 2024 26	Portsmouth	2–1	Stevenage	Portsmouth
15:00 GMT	Lane 12'; Bishop 33'; Pack (yellow card) 62'; Rafferty (yellow card) 86'; Norris (yellow card) 90+1'	Report	L.Thompson (yellow card) 11', (goal) 26'; Sweeney (yellow card) 35'; Freeman (yellow card) 42'; Roberts (yellow card) 57'; Piergianni (yellow card) 72'; N.Thompson (yellow card) 88' (red card) 90+6'	Stadium: Fratton Park; Attendance: 18,891; Referee: Charles Breakspear

6 January 2024 27	Cheltenham Town	2–1	Portsmouth	Cheltenham
15:00 GMT	Ferry (yellow card) 37'; Pett (yellow card) 45+3'; Sercombe 51', 54'; Bradbury (yellow card) 72'; Long (yellow card) 75'	Report	Kamara (yellow card) 34'; Bradbury 49' (o.g.); Bishop (yellow card) 87'; Rafferty (yellow card) 90+1'; Lane (yellow card) 90+4'; Scully (yellow card) 90+5'	Stadium: Whaddon Road; Attendance: 5,561; Referee: Simon Mather

13 January 2024 28	Portsmouth	0–3	Leyton Orient	Portsmouth
15:00 GMT	Bishop (penalty missed) 40'; Rafferty (yellow card) 41'	Report	Forde 30'; Brown 35', (yellow card) 89'; Galbraith (yellow card) 37'; Agyei 45+5'; Pigott (yellow card) 81'; Pratley (yellow card) 87'	Stadium: Fratton Park; Attendance: 19,477; Referee: Ben Speedie

20 January 2024 29	Fleetwood Town	0–1	Portsmouth	Fleetwood
15:00 GMT	Vela (yellow card) 30'; Heneghan (yellow card) 36'; Lawal (yellow card) 45'; Marriott (yellow card) 57'	Report	Kamara 25'; Morrell (yellow card) 42'; Shaughnessy (yellow card) 77'; Pack (yellow card) 90'; Lane (yellow card) 90+1'	Stadium: Highbury Stadium; Attendance: 3,782; Referee: Neil Hair

27 January 2024 30	Port Vale	0–1	Portsmouth	Stoke-on-Trent
15:00 GMT	Chislett (yellow card) 16'; Iacovitti (yellow card) 40'; Smith (yellow card) 45+4'; Massey (yellow card) 57'	Report	Lane (yellow card) 26'; Lowery (yellow card) 29'; Bishop 88' (pen.)	Stadium: Vale Park; Attendance: 8,068; Referee: Craig Hicks

30 January 2024 18	Oxford United	2–2	Portsmouth	Oxford
19:45 GMT	Goodrham 45'; Henry 90'	Report	Bishop (yellow card) 58', (goal) 69'; Lang 80'; Peart-Harris (yellow card) 81'	Stadium: Kassam Stadium; Attendance: 8,864; Referee: Darren Drysdale
Note: Fixture was originally scheduled for 18 November, but was postponed due to international call-ups.

3 February 2024 31	Portsmouth	4–1	Northampton Town	Portsmouth
15:00 GMT	Ogilvie 7'; Bishop (penalty missed) 40'; Lane 53', 58'; McIntyre (red card) 54'; Lang 71'; Sparkes (yellow card) 90+5'	Report	Guthrie (yellow card) 42'; Leonard 89'	Stadium: Fratton Park; Attendance: 19,245; Referee: Sam Purkiss

10 February 2024 32	Carlisle United	0–1	Portsmouth	Carlisle
15:00 GMT	Josh Vela (yellow card) 29'	Report	Lane 62'	Stadium: Brunton Park; Attendance: 9,053; Referee: Martin Woods

13 February 2024 33	Portsmouth	3–1	Cambridge United	Portsmouth
19:45 GMT	Norris (yellow card) 39'; Yengi 44' (pen.); Peart-Harris 59'; Kamara 71'; Sparkes (yellow card) 89'	Report	Bennett (yellow card) 5'; Andrew 38'; Lankester (yellow card) 44'; Stevens (yellow card) 44'; Gibbons (yellow card) 45+1'; Morrison (yellow card) 61'	Stadium: Fratton Park; Attendance: 19,445; Referee: Sam Allison

17 February 2024 34	Portsmouth	4–1	Reading	Portsmouth
15:00 GMT	Shaughnessy (yellow card) 30'; Lane 36'; Pack (yellow card) 45+1', (goal) 49'; Lang 59'; Rafferty (yellow card) 67'; Bishop 84'; Martin (yellow card) 90+3'	Report	Wing (yellow card) 40'; Mola (yellow card) 45'; Azeez (yellow card) 45+3'; Savage 89'	Stadium: Fratton Park; Attendance: 20,113; Referee: Josh Smith

24 February 2024 35	Charlton Athletic	0–0	Portsmouth	Charlton
15:00 GMT	Bakinson (yellow card) 38'; Jones (yellow card) 67'	Report		Stadium: The Valley; Attendance: 16,732; Referee: Robert Madley

2 March 2024 36	Portsmouth	2–1	Oxford United	Portsmouth
15:00 GMT	Lang 2', (yellow card) 28'; Ogilvie (yellow card) 65'; Saydee 67'; Kamara (yellow card) 81'; Bishop (yellow card) 86'	Report	Brannagan 6' (pen.); Harris (yellow card) 30'; Rodrigues (yellow card) 42'; Henry (yellow card) 90+5'	Stadium: Fratton Park; Attendance: 20,303; Referee: Ben Toner

9 March 2024 37	Blackpool	0–0	Portsmouth	Blackpool
15:00 GMT	Rhodes (red card) 43'; Norburn (yellow card) 46'	Report	Peart-Harris (yellow card) 29'; Sparkes (yellow card) 52'; Moxon (yellow card) 66'; Saydee (yellow card) 76'	Stadium: Bloomfield Road; Attendance: 11,811; Referee: Edward Duckworth

12 March 2024 38	Portsmouth	2–1	Burton Albion	Portsmouth
19:45 GMT	Yengi 45+3' (pen.), 63'	Report	Helm (yellow card) 14'; Brayford (yellow card) 24'; Crocombe (yellow card) 34'; Brayford 81'; Carayol (yellow card) 83'	Stadium: Fratton Park; Attendance: 19,536; Referee: Adam Herczeg

16 March 2024 39	Peterborough United	0–1	Portsmouth	Peterborough
15:00 GMT	Poku (yellow card) 75'	Report	Sparkes (yellow card) 75'; Yengi 77'; Pack (yellow card) 78'	Stadium: London Road; Attendance: 12,755; Referee: Alex Chilowicz
Note: John Mousinho (yellow card) 73'

29 March 2024 41	Wycombe Wanderers	1–3	Portsmouth	High Wycombe
15:00 GMT	Butcher 7'; Tafazolli (yellow card) 30'; Potts (yellow card) 88'	Report	Bishop 3', 28', (yellow card) 87'; Norris (yellow card) 57'; Moxon (yellow card) 60'; Saydee 67'	Stadium: Adams Park; Attendance: 6,793; Referee: Tom Nield

2 April 2024 42	Portsmouth	2–2	Derby County	Portsmouth
20:00 BST	Lane (yellow card) 20'; Kamara 27'; Ogilvie (yellow card) 72'; Moxon 77'	Report	Ward 23', 35'; Collins (yellow card) 43'	Stadium: Fratton Park; Attendance: 20,129 (+1 fox!); Referee: William Finnie
Note: Fixture was initially scheduled for 1 April, but was moved for live Sky Sports broadcasting.

6 April 2024 43	Portsmouth	3–1	Shrewsbury Town	Portsmouth
15:00 BST	Dunkley 3' (o.g.); Swanson (yellow card) 35'; Bishop 42' (pen.), 77'; Moxon (yellow card) 79'	Report	Shipley 29'; Benning (yellow card) 45+3'; Bennett (yellow card) 50'; Flanagan (yellow card) 89'	Stadium: Fratton Park; Attendance: 20,081; Referee: Charles Breakspear

13 April 2024 44	Bolton Wanderers	1–1	Portsmouth	Bolton
15:00 BST	Toal (yellow card) 32'; Collins 36'; Santos (yellow card) 88'; Jerome (yellow card) 90+1'	Report	Kamara 7'; Lang (yellow card) 15'	Stadium: Toughsheet Community Stadium; Attendance: 25,738; Referee: Anthony Backhouse

16 April 2024 40	Portsmouth	3–2	Barnsley	Portsmouth
19:45 BST	Yengi 9'; Evans (yellow card) 74'; Bishop 83' (pen.); Shaughnessy 89'	Report	Cole 6'; McAtee 59'; De Gevigney (yellow card) 75'	Stadium: Fratton Park; Attendance: 19,960; Referee: Paul Howard
Note: Portsmouth promoted & EFL League One Champions. Fixture was originally scheduled for 23 March, but was postponed due to international call-ups.

20 April 2024 45	Portsmouth	1–2	Wigan Athletic	Portsmouth
15:00 BST	Lang (yellow card) 17'; Pack (yellow card) 62'; Yengi 85'	Report	Chambers 22'; Hughes (yellow card) 32'; Magennis 83'	Stadium: Fratton Park; Attendance: 20,202; Referee: Dean Whitestone
Note: Portsmouth presented with EFL League One champions trophy after full-time.

27 April 2024 46	Lincoln City	0–2	Portsmouth	Lincoln
15:00 BST	House (yellow card) 39'; Taylor (yellow card) 42'; Mandroiu (penalty missed) 53'; Erhahon (yellow card) 90+7'	Report	Towler (yellow card) 37'; Peart-Harris (yellow card) 39', (goal) 81'; Tom Lowery (yellow card) 57'; Moxon (yellow card) 70'; Sparkes (yellow card) 76'; Yengi (yellow card) 90+4'; Saydee (yellow card) 90+9'; Lane 90+12'	Stadium: Sincil Bank; Attendance: 10,006; Referee: Sunny Sukhvir Gill
Note: John Mousinho (yellow card) 41'

=== FA Cup ===
Portsmouth were drawn away to Chesterfield in the first round.

Win Draw Loss Fixtures

5 November 2023 First Round	Chesterfield	1–0	Portsmouth	Chesterfield
12:15 GMT	Naylor 32' (yellow card) 72'; Jones (yellow card) 87'; Palmer (yellow card) 90+3'	Report	Rafferty (yellow card) 38'; Kamara (yellow card) 77'	Stadium: SMH Group Stadium; Attendance: 8,377; Referee: Will Finnie

=== EFL Cup ===
Pompey were drawn away to Forest Green Rovers in the first round and at home to Peterborough United in the second round.

Win Draw Loss Fixtures

8 August 2023 First round	Forest Green Rovers	1–3	Portsmouth	Nailsworth
19:45 BST	Omotoye 24'	Report	Yengi (yellow card) 12', (goal) 30', 75' (pen.); Scully (yellow card) 32'; Swanson 52'; Devlin (yellow card) 58'	Stadium: The Bolt New Lawn; Referee: Sam Purkiss

29 August 2023 Second round	Portsmouth	1–1 (4–5 p)	Peterborough United	Portsmouth
19:45 BST	Robertson (yellow card) 39'; Saydee 51'; Stevenson (yellow card) 53'	Report	Ajiboye 29'; Fernandez (yellow card) 44'; O'Connell (yellow card) 44' (yellow-red card) 59'	Stadium: Fratton Park; Attendance: 6,594; Referee: Charles Breakspear
	Penalties
	Bishop (penalty scored); Raggett (penalty scored); Pack (penalty scored); Saydee (penalty scored); Kamara (penalty missed); Morrell (penalty missed)		Knight (penalty scored); de Havilland (penalty missed); Tomlinson (penalty scored); Jones (penalty scored); Corbett (penalty scored); Ajiboye (penalty scored)

=== EFL Trophy ===
In the group stage, Portsmouth were drawn into Southern Group E alongside Gillingham, Leyton Orient and Fulham U21. After topping their group, they were drawn at home to AFC Wimbledon in the second round.

Pos	Div	Team	Pld	W	PW	PL	L	GF	GA	GD	Pts	Qualification
1	L1	Portsmouth	3	2	1	0	0	10	5	+5	8	Advance to Round 2
2	ACA	Fulham U21	3	1	0	2	0	6	5	+1	5	Advance to Round 2
3	L2	Gillingham	3	1	0	0	2	3	7	−4	3	
4	L1	Leyton Orient	3	0	1	0	2	4	6	−2	2	

Updated to match(es) played on 7 November 2023. Source: EFL.com

Win Draw Loss Fixtures

22 August 2023 Group stage	Portsmouth	3–3 (5–4 p)	Fulham U21	Portsmouth
19:45 BST	Raggett 17', 51' (yellow card) 89'; Devlin 28'; Stevenson (yellow card) 67'; Robertson (yellow card) 82'	Report	Donnell 1'; Okkas (yellow card) 25' (yellow-red card) 45+5'; Godo 39'; Tanton (yellow card) 55'; McCoy-Splatt 73'	Stadium: Fratton Park; Attendance: 3,596; Referee: Carl Brook
	Penalties
	Raggett (penalty scored); Robertson (penalty scored); Scully (penalty scored); Swanson (penalty missed); Kamara (penalty scored); Sparkes (penalty scored)		Dibley-Dias (penalty scored); McFarlane (penalty scored); Donnell (penalty scored); Araujo (penalty missed); Šekularac (penalty scored); Tanton (penalty missed)

10 October 2023 Group stage	Portsmouth	5–1	Gillingham	Portsmouth
19:45 BST	Anjorin 11'; Towler (yellow card) 47' (goal) 80'; Stevenson 50'; Yengi 54'; Kamara 72'		Jefferies (yellow card) 25'; Ogie (yellow card) 37'; Williams J. 45'; Orji (yellow card) 53'	Stadium: Fratton Park; Attendance: 5,066; Referee: Farai Hallam

7 November 2023 Group stage	Leyton Orient	1–2	Portsmouth	Leyton
19:00 GMT	Pigott 58'	Report	Raggett (red card) 20'; Saydee 44'; Kamara 74'	Stadium: Brisbane Road; Attendance: 2,371; Referee: Stephen Parkinson

19 December 2023 Second round	Portsmouth	2–5	AFC Wimbledon	Portsmouth
19:45 GMT	Yengi 43'; Rafferty (yellow card) 47'; Hume (yellow card) 50'; Whyte 58'; Towler (yellow card) 76'	Report	Sasu 11'; Johnson (yellow card) 18'; Davison 22'; Pearce 28' (yellow card) 50'; Pell 48'; Tilley (yellow card) 51'; Al-Hamadi 89'	Stadium: Fratton Park; Attendance: 7,922; Referee: Craig Hicks

== Statistics ==
=== Appearances and goals ===
As of match(es) played 27 April 2024

Players with no appearances are not included on the list
Italics indicate a loaned in player

No.	Pos	Nat	Player	Total		League One		FA Cup		EFL Cup		EFL Trophy	
No.	Pos	Nat	Player	Apps	Goals	Apps	Goals	Apps	Goals	Apps	Goals	Apps	Goals
1	GK	(England) ENG	Will Norris	47	0	46+0	0	1+0	0	0+0	0	0+0	0
2	DF	(England) ENG	Zak Swanson	19	1	7+5	0	0+1	0	2+0	1	4+0	0
4	DF	(England) ENG	Ryley Towler	11	1	3+3	0	0	0	1+0	0	4+0	1
5	DF	(Wales) WAL	Regan Poole	16	3	14+0	3	1+0	0	0+1	0	0+0	0
6	DF	(England) ENG	Connor Ogilvie	25	2	23+1	2	0+0	0	0+1	0	0+0	0
7	MF	(England) ENG	Marlon Pack	39	3	37+1	3	0+0	0	0+1	0	0+0	0
8	MF	(Australia) AUS	Alex Robertson	27	1	20+3	1	1+0	0	1+1	0	0+1	0
9	FW	(England) ENG	Colby Bishop	48	21	40+4	21	1+0	0	0+2	0	0+1	0
10	FW	(Republic of Ireland) IRL	Anthony Scully	8	0	3+3	0	0+0	0	0+0	0	0+2	0
11	FW	(Northern Ireland) NIR	Gavin Whyte	33	1	12+17	0	0+1	0	0+0	0	3+0	1
14	MF	(England) ENG	Ben Stevenson	10	1	1+3	0	0+0	0	2+0	0	4+0	1
15	FW	(England) ENG	Christian Saydee	42	4	12+24	2	0+0	0	2+0	1	4+0	1
16	MF	(Wales) WAL	Joe Morrell	31	0	26+1	0	1+0	0	0+2	0	0+1	0
17	DF	(Republic of Ireland) IRL	Joe Rafferty	42	0	36+3	0	1+0	0	0+0	0	1+1	0
18	DF	(Republic of Ireland) IRL	Conor Shaughnessy	49	4	45+0	4	1+0	0	1+0	0	0+2	0
19	FW	(Australia) AUS	Kusini Yengi	31	13	7+19	9	0+1	0	1+0	2	3+0	2
20	DF	(England) ENG	Sean Raggett	44	3	30+8	1	0+1	0	2+0	0	3+0	2
21	DF	(England) ENG	Jack Sparkes	43	0	22+16	0	1+0	0	2+0	0	2+0	0
23	MF	(England) ENG	Owen Moxon	15	1	8+7	1	0+0	0	0+0	0	0+0	0
24	MF	(Northern Ireland) NIR	Terry Devlin	25	2	6+13	1	1+0	0	2+0	0	2+1	1
25	FW	(England) ENG	Abu Kamara	52	10	37+9	8	0+1	0	1+1	0	3+0	2
26	MF	(England) ENG	Tom Lowery	9	0	7+2	0	0+0	0	0+0	0	0+0	0
28	MF	(England) ENG	Tino Anjorin	14	2	5+7	1	1+0	0	0+0	0	1+0	1
29	FW	(England) ENG	Josh Martin	9	0	2+6	0	0+0	0	0+0	0	1+0	0
30	MF	(Wales) WAL	Harry Jewitt-White	2	0	0+0	0	0+0	0	0+0	0	1+1	0
31	GK	(England) ENG	Ryan Schofield	6	0	0+0	0	0+0	0	2+0	0	4+0	0
32	FW	(Northern Ireland) NIR	Paddy Lane	45	12	35+7	12	1+0	0	1+0	0	1+0	0
35	FW	(England) ENG	Koby Mottoh	5	0	0+0	0	0+0	0	1+1	0	1+2	0
37	FW	(Republic of Ireland) IRL	Sam Folarin	1	0	0+0	0	0+0	0	0+0	0	0+1	0
39	MF	(England) ENG	Mitch Aston	1	0	0+0	0	0+0	0	0+0	0	0+1	0
44	FW	(England) ENG	Myles Peart-Harris	12	2	10+2	2	0+0	0	0+0	0	0+0	0
35	MF	(Wales) WAL	Lee Evans	4	0	2+2	0	0+0	0	0+0	0	0+0	0
46	DF	(Scotland) SCO	Tom McIntyre	1	0	1+0	0	0+0	0	0+0	0	0+0	0
49	FW	(England) ENG	Callum Lang	12	4	9+3	4	0+0	0	0+0	0	0+0	0
Player(s) who featured but departed permanently during the season:
23	DF	(England) ENG	Denver Hume	2	0	0+0	0	0+0	0	0+0	0	2+0	0

=== Disciplinary record ===
As of match(es) played 27 April 2024

Players with no cards are not included on the list
Italics indicate a loaned in player

No.	Pos	Nat	Player	Total		League One		FA Cup		EFL Cup		EFL Trophy	
No.	Pos	Nat	Player	Yellow card	Red card	Yellow card	Red card	Yellow card	Red card	Yellow card	Red card	Yellow card	Red card
1	GK	(England) ENG	Will Norris	5	0	5	0	0	0	0	0	0	0
2	DF	(England) ENG	Zak Swanson	2	0	2	0	0	0	0	0	0	0
4	DF	(England) ENG	Ryley Towler	4	0	2	0	0	0	0	0	2	0
5	DF	(Wales) WAL	Regan Poole	5	0	5	0	0	0	0	0	0	0
6	DF	(England) ENG	Connor Ogilvie	3	0	3	0	0	0	0	0	0	0
7	MF	(England) ENG	Marlon Pack	7	0	7	0	0	0	0	0	0	0
8	MF	(Australia) AUS	Alex Robertson	10	0	8	0	0	0	1	0	1	0
9	FW	(England) ENG	Colby Bishop	4	0	4	0	0	0	0	0	0	0
10	FW	(Republic of Ireland) IRL	Anthony Scully	3	0	2	0	0	0	1	0	0	0
11	FW	(Northern Ireland) NIR	Gavin Whyte	1	0	1	0	0	0	0	0	0	0
14	MF	(England) ENG	Ben Stevenson	2	0	0	0	0	0	1	0	1	0
15	FW	(England) ENG	Christian Saydee	5	0	5	0	0	0	0	0	0	0
16	MF	(Wales) WAL	Joe Morrell	11	2	11	2	0	0	0	0	0	0
17	DF	(Republic of Ireland) IRL	Joe Rafferty	9	1	7	1	1	0	0	0	1	0
18	DF	(Republic of Ireland) IRL	Conor Shaughnessy	4	0	4	0	0	0	0	0	0	0
19	FW	(Australia) AUS	Kusini Yengi	3	0	2	0	0	0	1	0	0	0
20	DF	(England) ENG	Sean Raggett	4	1	3	0	0	0	0	0	1	1
21	DF	(England) ENG	Jack Sparkes	11	0	11	0	0	0	0	0	0	0
23	MF	(England) ENG	Owen Moxon	4	0	4	0	0	0	0	0	0	0
24	MF	(Northern Ireland) NIR	Terry Devlin	1	0	0	0	0	0	1	0	0	0
25	FW	(England) ENG	Abu Kamara	7	0	6	0	1	0	0	0	0	0
26	MF	(England) ENG	Tom Lowery	3	0	3	0	0	0	0	0	0	0
29	FW	(England) ENG	Josh Martin	1	0	1	0	0	0	0	0	0	0
32	FW	(Northern Ireland) NIR	Paddy Lane	7	0	7	0	0	0	0	0	0	0
35	MF	(Wales) WAL	Lee Evans	1	0	1	0	0	0	0	0	0	0
44	FW	(England) ENG	Myles Peart-Harris	3	0	3	0	0	0	0	0	0	0
46	DF	(Scotland) SCO	Tom McIntyre	0	1	0	1	0	0	0	0	0	0
49	FW	(England) ENG	Callum Lang	3	0	3	0	0	0	0	0	0	0
Player(s) who featured but departed permanently during the season:
23	DF	(England) ENG	Denver Hume	1	0	0	0	0	0	0	0	1	0
Squad Total				124	4	110	4	2	0	5	0	7	1
