= Abdoulaye Kamara =

Guinean footballer (born 2004)

Personal information
- Full name: Abdoulaye Kamara
- Date of birth: 6 November 2004 (age 22)
- Place of birth: Conakry, Guinea
- Height: 1.85 m (6 ft 1 in)
- Position: Defensive midfielder

Team information
- Current team: 1. FC Saarbrücken
- Number: 15

Youth career
- –2021: Paris Saint-Germain
- 2021–2023: Borussia Dortmund

Senior career*
Years	Team	Apps	(Gls)
2021–2024	Borussia Dortmund II	48	(2)
2024–2025	Portsmouth	5	(0)
2025–	1. FC Saarbrücken	13	(1)
- * Club domestic league appearances and goals as of 30 May 2026

Abdoulaye Kamara (born 6 November 2004) is a Guinean professional footballer who plays as a defensive midfielder for German 3. Liga club 1. FC Saarbrücken.

== Career ==
Kamara is a product of the Paris Saint-Germain Academy. He played for the under-19 side of the club in the 2020–21 season despite being three years younger than the maximum age for the team. On 5 August 2020, he made his debut for Paris Saint-Germain's senior team in a 1–0 friendly victory over Sochaux.

On 20 July 2021, Kamara signed for Bundesliga club Borussia Dortmund, having declined a professional contract at PSG in order to move to Germany.

On 20 August 2024, Kamara signed for EFL Championship club Portsmouth on a four-year deal for an undisclosed fee.

On 1 September 2025, Kamara signed for 3. Liga club 1. FC Saarbrücken on a free transfer.

== Personal life ==
Kamara was born in Guinea and holds Guinean nationality.

== Career statistics ==
As of match played 6 January 2026

Appearances and goals by club, season and competition
Club	Season	League			National cup (Note: Includes FA Cup)		League cup		Other		Total	
Club	Season	Division	Apps	Goals	Apps	Goals	Apps	Goals	Apps	Goals	Apps	Goals
Borussia Dortmund II	2021–22	3. Liga	14	0	—		—		—		14	0
Borussia Dortmund II	2022–23	3. Liga	20	1	—		—		—		20	1
Borussia Dortmund II	2023–24	3. Liga	13	0	—		—		—		13	0
Borussia Dortmund II	2024–25	3. Liga	1	1	—		—		—		1	1
Borussia Dortmund II	Total		48	2	—		—		—		48	2
Portsmouth	2024–25	EFL Championship	5	0	1	0	0	0	—		6	0
1. FC Saarbrücken	2025–26	3. Liga	11	1	0	0	0	0	—		0	0
Career total			64	3	1	0	0	0	0	0	54	2
