= Abu Kamara (footballer, born 2003) =

English footballer (born 2003)

- Kamara with Portsmouth in 2026

Personal information
- Full name: Abu Bakarr Kamara
- Date of birth: 21 July 2003 (age 23)
- Place of birth: Lambeth, England
- Height: 6 ft 0 in (1.83 m)
- Position: Right winger

Team information
- Current team: Portsmouth
- Number: 11

Youth career
- 2013–2023: Norwich City

Senior career*
Years	Team	Apps	(Gls)
2023–2024	Norwich City	5	(0)
2023–2024	→ Portsmouth (loan)	46	(8)
2024–2026	Hull City	38	(5)
2025–2026	→ Getafe (loan)	12	(0)
2026–	Portsmouth	15	(0)

International career^{‡}
2024	England U20	2	(0)
- * Club domestic league appearances and goals as of 16:24, 7 November 2026 (UTC) ‡ National team caps and goals as of 08:46, 14 June 2024 (UTC)

Abu Bakarr Kamara (born 21 July 2003) is an English professional footballer who plays as a right winger for EFL Championship club Portsmouth.

== Club career ==
=== Norwich City ===
Kamara joined the youth academy of Norwich City at the age of ten, and worked his way up their youth categories. In January 2021, he signed his first professional contract with the club until 2023; in October of the same year, he extended his deal until 2025.

On 1 April 2023, Kamara made his professional debut for Norwich, coming on as a substitute for Teemu Pukki in the 70th minute of a 1–0 Championship defeat to Sheffield United.

==== Portsmouth (loan) ====
On 19 July 2023, Kamara joined EFL League One side Portsmouth on a season-long loan. He scored his first goal for Pompey in their 3–1 home win over Peterborough United on 2 September 2023. This was also Kamara's first goal in senior football.

Following his loan at Portsmouth expiring at the end of the 2023–24 season, Kamara briefly returned to Norwich, scoring his first goal for the Canaries in their EFL Cup tie at home to Stevenage on 13 August 2024.

=== Hull City ===
A few weeks later, on 30 August 2024, Kamara signed a four-year deal with fellow EFL Championship side Hull City, arriving for an undisclosed fee. Despite the club not making the figure public, it is rumoured that it may have risen as high as £4,500,000 with add-ons included. On 1 January 2025, after losing 1–0 at home to Middlesbrough, Kamara faced backlash for his part in Boro's last-minute winner. Later that day, he received further abuse from Hull supporters online, after he posted celebratory emojis on former club Portsmouth's social media, in reaction to their 4–0 thrashing of Swansea City. Kamara apologised for his actions, but was defended by his head coach Rubén Sellés regardless. On 4 January, he scored his first goals for Hull when he struck an impressive brace in a 3–3 draw at home to Leeds United. Against the league leaders, Kamara gave the Tigers a shock advantage after 5 minutes, lobbing visiting goalkeeper Illan Meslier after a well-timed through ball from Abdülkadir Ömür. In the dying embers of the match, Meslier failed to clear a corner properly, leaving Kamara to hit a low volley beyond the Frenchman to equalise, in turn earning his team a vital point in their fight for Championship survival.

==== Getafe (loan) ====
On 1 September 2025, Kamara moved abroad for the first time in his career, after agreeing to a one-year loan deal with La Liga side Getafe.

=== Portsmouth ===
On 10 August 2026, Kamara returned to Portsmouth on a three-year deal for an undisclosed fee.

== International career ==
On 7 June 2024, Kamara made his England U20 debut during a 2–1 win over Sweden at Stadion ŠRC Sesvete.

== Style of play ==
Kamara started playing in Norwich City's academy as a winger, moving to left-back, then attacking midfielder, before finally settling as a striker. He describes himself as a "willing runner" who helps out the team and "attempts to score all the chances given to him".

== Personal life ==
Born in England, Kamara is of Sierra Leonean descent.

== Career statistics ==
As of 7 November 2026

Appearances and goals by club, season and competition
Club	Season	League			National cup (Note: Includes FA Cup, Copa del Rey)		League cup (Note: Includes EFL Cup)		Other		Total	
Club	Season	Division	Apps	Goals	Apps	Goals	Apps	Goals	Apps	Goals	Apps	Goals
Norwich City U21	2020–21	—			—		—		1 (Note: Appearance(s) in EFL Trophy)	0	1	0
Norwich City	2022–23	Championship	3	0	0	0	0	0	—		3	0
Norwich City	2024–25	Championship	2	0	—		1	1	—		3	1
Norwich City	Total		5	0	0	0	1	1	—		6	1
Portsmouth (loan)	2023–24	League One	46	8	1	0	2	0	3	2	52	10
Hull City	2024–25	Championship	36	5	1	0	—		—		37	5
Hull City	2025–26	Championship	2	0	0	0	1	0	—		3	0
Hull City	Total		38	5	1	0	1	0	—		40	5
Getafe (loan)	2025–26	La Liga	12	0	1	0	0	0	—		13	0
Portsmouth	2026–27	Championship	15	0	0	0	0	0	—		15	0
Career total			116	13	3	0	4	1	4	2	127	16

== Honours ==
Portsmouth

- EFL League One: 2023–24
