= Mitch Aston =

English footballer (born 200?)

Mitchell Aston
Personal information
- Date of birth: 4 May 2006 (age 20)
- Position: Midfielder

Team information
- Current team: Havant & Waterlooville
- Number: 19

Youth career
- Portsmouth

Senior career*
| Years | Team | Apps | (Gls) |
| 2023–2024 | Portsmouth | 0 | (0) |
| 2024– | Havant & Waterlooville | 4 | (0) |
- * Club domestic league appearances and goals as of 00:00, 10 August 2025 (UTC)

Mitch Aston (born 4 May 2006) is an English footballer who plays as a midfielder for Southern League Premier Division South club Havant & Waterlooville.

== Career ==
Aston made his senior debut for Portsmouth at the age of 17 years, five months and six days on 10 October 2023, coming on as an 81st-minute substitute for Jack Sparkes in a 5–1 win over Gillingham in an EFL Trophy group stage game at Fratton Park. Manager John Mousinho said that "whatever happens in his career, nobody can take that away from him".

== Style of play ==
Aston is a skilful midfielder with high energy and ball-retention skills.

== Career statistics ==
As of match played 10 August 2025

Appearances and goals by club, season and competition
| Club | Season | League | | | FA Cup | | EFL Cup | | Other | | Total | |
| Club | Season | Division | Apps | Goals | Apps | Goals | Apps | Goals | Apps | Goals | Apps | Goals |
|---|---|---|---|---|---|---|---|---|---|---|---|---|
| Portsmouth | 2023–24 | EFL League One | 0 | 0 | 0 | 0 | 0 | 0 | 1 (Note: Appearances in EFL Trophy) | 0 | 1 | 0 |
| Havant & Waterlooville | 2024-25 | Southern League | 3 | 0 | 0 | 0 | 0 | 0 | 0 | 0 | 3 | 0 |
| Havant & Waterlooville | 2025-26 | Southern League | 1 | 0 | 0 | 0 | 0 | 0 | 0 | 0 | 1 | 0 |
| Career total | | | 4 | 0 | 0 | 0 | 0 | 0 | 1 | 0 | 5 | 0 |
