= Will Norris =

English footballer

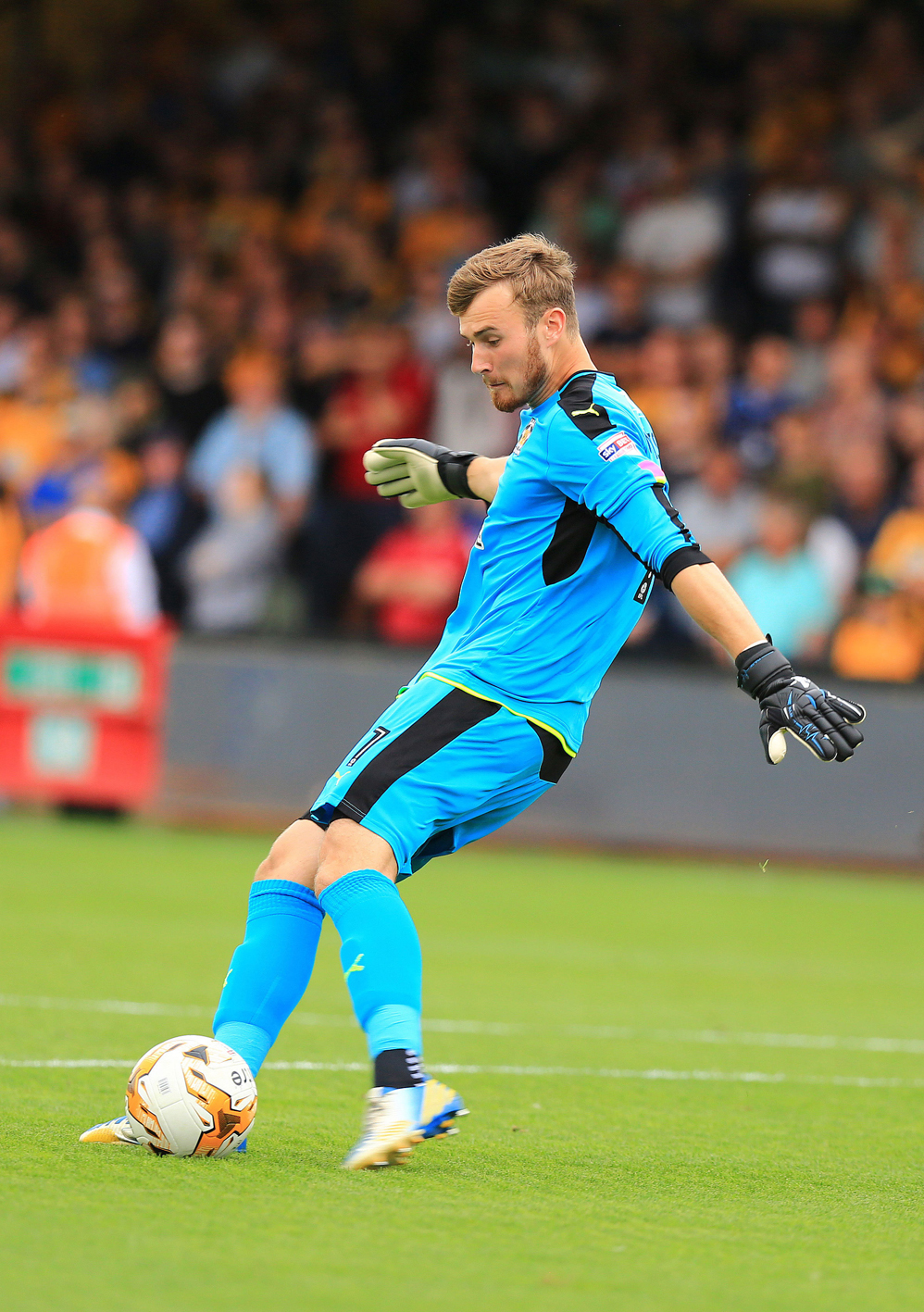
- Norris playing for Cambridge United in 2016

Personal information
- Full name: William James Norris
- Date of birth: 12 August 1993 (age 33)
- Place of birth: Watford, England
- Height: 6 ft 5 in (1.95 m)
- Position: Goalkeeper

Team information
- Current team: Salford City
- Number: 1

Youth career
- 2006–2011: Northwood

Senior career*
Years	Team	Apps	(Gls)
2011	Hatfield Town	16	(0)
2011–2012	Royston Town	27	(0)
2012–2017	Cambridge United	84	(0)
2012–2013	→ Royston Town (loan)	27	(0)
2013	→ Royston Town (loan)	6	(0)
2015–2016	→ Braintree Town (loan)	24	(0)
2017–2020	Wolverhampton Wanderers	2	(0)
2019–2020	→ Ipswich Town (loan)	15	(0)
2020–2023	Burnley	2	(0)
2023	→ Peterborough United (loan)	24	(0)
2023–2025	Portsmouth	54	(0)
2025–2026	Wycombe Wanderers	51	(0)
2026–	Salford City	12	(0)
- * Club domestic league appearances and goals as of 22:00, 20 October 2026 (UTC)

William James Norris (born 12 August 1993) is an English professional footballer who plays as a goalkeeper for EFL League Two club Salford City.

== Club career ==
=== Royston Town ===
Without a club at the start of the 2011–12 season, Norris made an approach to join Hertfordshire side Royston Town who in the previous season had narrowly missed out on promotion after finishing 3rd in the Spartan South Midlands League Premier Division. He played a number of games for the reserve team where his performances caught the attention of then first team manager, Paul Attfield, who pulled him into the first team. On 20 September 2011, he made his debut for Royston in a 4–1 home win against Haringey Borough in the Spartan South Midlands League Premier Division Cup. Norris went on to make 41 appearances in all competitions in 2011–12 helping the club to secure the Spartan South Midlands Premier Division title and a cup double which included the Spartan South Midlands League Premier Division Cup and the South Midlands Floodlit Cup. In the quarter-final of the Cambridgeshire Invitation Cup against Cambridge City on 25 January 2012, the game was decided by a penalty shoot-out in which Norris pulled off a number of saves in sudden death before scoring the winning penalty to send Royston into the semi-final.

=== Cambridge United ===
On 16 July 2012, Norris signed for Cambridge United on a two-year deal and was loaned back to Royston Town for the duration of the 2012–13 season, helping the club to a 7th-place finish in the Southern Football League Division One Central.

Norris spent the first half of the season 2013–14 with Cambridge as second choice to Chris Maxwell, before re-joining Royston in December 2013 on a short-term loan spell. He was recalled to make his first team debut for Cambridge in a 1–0 away win at Tamworth in the Conference Premier on 21 January 2014. On 30 January 2014, he signed a new contract with the club which extended his previous deal by two and a half years to 2016. He went on to make a total of 15 league appearances helping Cambridge make a return to The Football League, after a nine-year absence, via the Conference play-offs. Norris kept a clean sheet in Cambridge's 4–0 victory over Gosport Borough in the 2014 FA Trophy final.

Norris made his Football League debut for Cambridge in a 2–2 draw at home to Accrington Stanley on 11 April 2015. He went on to make a total of 3 appearances in the league in 2014–15 as Cambridge finished 19th in their first season back in the Football League. At the end of the season his contract was extended to 2018, and was loaned to Braintree Town for the beginning of 2015–16. On 8 August 2015, he made his debut for Braintree in a 1–0 away defeat to Chester City in the National League. After a run of impressive performances, keeping four clean sheets in six games, he was named the National League's Player of the Month for October. At the time of collecting the award Norris had amassed 9 clean sheets in the league; the most of any goalkeeper in the top 5 English divisions. On 9 January 2016, Norris was recalled from his loan with Braintree. He went on to make a total of 21 league appearances for Cambridge, keeping 9 clean sheets, as the club finished 9th in League Two. His contract was extended by a further year, to 2019.

In the 2016–17 season Norris saved a club record of five penalties in one season, including two in second half stoppage time against Accrington Stanley. The gloves he used in the double penalty save against Accrington raised £1,000 at a charity auction, with the proceeds being donated to injured footballers Shaun Whiter and Joey Abbs, who were victims of a hit-and-run incident.

=== Wolverhampton Wanderers ===
On 11 July 2017, Norris signed a three-year deal for Wolverhampton Wanderers for an undisclosed fee, a day after the then Championship club had signed a fellow former Cambridge goalkeeper, John Ruddy. He made his debut for the club on 8 August 2017 in a 1–0 win against Yeovil Town in the second round of the EFL Cup. Norris made his league debut for Wolves on 6 May 2018 against Sunderland. Wolves were promoted to the Premier League as Champions at the end of the 2017–18 season. Norris made his Premier League debut for Wolves as a second-half injury time substitute in the 1–0 home win against Fulham on 4 May 2019.

=== Ipswich Town (loan) ===
On 30 July 2019, Norris joined Ipswich Town on loan for the 2019–20 season. He made his debut for the club in a 3–1 loss to Luton Town in the EFL Cup, on 13 August 2019. On 9 November, Norris saved a penalty during a 1–1 draw with Lincoln City in an FA Cup first-round tie at Portman Road. Norris made a total of 20 appearances for the club during his loan spell prior to the League One season being ended early.

=== Burnley ===
On 14 August 2020, Norris signed a three-year deal for Burnley for an undisclosed fee. He made his debut for the club in a 4–3 penalty shootout win against MK Dons in the FA Cup on 9 January 2021, saving two penalties in the shootout. On 19 May 2021, Norris made his league debut for Burnley in a 0–3 home defeat to Liverpool.

=== Peterborough United (loan) ===
On 6 January 2023, Norris joined League One club Peterborough United on loan until the end of the 2022–23 season. On 16 January 2023, Norris made his league debut for Peterborough in a 2–0 away win against Port Vale. Norris kept 11 clean sheets in his 24 appearances for Peterborough.

=== Portsmouth ===
On 14 June 2023, Norris agreed to sign for League One club Portsmouth on a three-year deal. On 5 August 2023, Norris made his league debut for Portsmouth in a 1–1 home draw against Bristol Rovers. Norris was named in the League One Team of the Season at the EFL Awards along with teammates Marlon Pack and Conor Shaughnessy. Norris was an ever-present as Portsmouth were promoted to the Championship as league winners, having spent the previous six seasons in League One. He captained the side on the final day of the season in a 2–0 away win against Lincoln City in which he saved a second half penalty from Daniel Mândroiu. Norris kept 19 clean sheets in the league in 2023–24. Norris made 8 league appearances for Portsmouth in 2024–25 in their return to the Championship. Norris kept 2 clean sheets and was named man of the match in both games. Norris left the club on 3 February 2025, by mutual agreement, to join Wycombe Wanderers.

=== Wycombe Wanderers ===
On 3 February 2025, Norris signed for League One club Wycombe Wanderers. Norris kept 8 clean sheets in 17 league appearances, helping Wycombe to a 5th place finish in 2024–25. Norris made 34 appearances in the league in 2025–26, keeping 12 clean sheets, as Wycombe finished 11th in League One. On 12 May 2026, the club said it had offered the player a new contract.

=== Salford City ===
On 26 June 2026, Norris signed for League Two club Salford City. On 8 August 2026, Norris made his debut for Salford in a 1–1 home draw against Shrewsbury Town. Both Norris and Shrewsbury goalkeeper Will Brook saved four penalties each in the shoutout as Shrewsbury won 4-3.

== Career statistics ==
As of match played 25 April 2026

Appearances and goals by club, season and competition
Club	Season	League			FA Cup		League Cup		Other		Total	
Club	Season	Division	Apps	Goals	Apps	Goals	Apps	Goals	Apps	Goals	Apps	Goals
Hatfield Town	2010–11	Spartan South Midlands League Premier	16	0	—		—		1 (Note: Appearance in South Midlands Senior Floodlit Cup)	0	17	0
Royston Town	2011–12	Spartan South Midlands League Premier	27	0	—		—		13 (Note: Four appearances in FA Vase, three appearances in Spartan South Midlands Premier Division Cup, three appearances in Cambridgeshire Invitation Cup, two appearances in South Midlands Senior Floodlit Cup, one appearance in Herts Senior Cup)	0	40	0
Cambridge United	2012–13	Conference Premier	0	0	0	0	—		0	0	0	0
Cambridge United	2013–14	Conference Premier	15	0	0	0	—		4 (Note: Appearances in FA Trophy)	0	19	0
Cambridge United	2014–15	League Two	3	0	0	0	0	0	0	0	3	0
Cambridge United	2015–16	League Two	21	0	0	0	0	0	0	0	21	0
Cambridge United	2016–17	League Two	45	0	4	0	1	0	4 (Note: Appearances in EFL Trophy)	0	54	0
Cambridge United	Total		84	0	4	0	1	0	8	0	97	0
Royston Town (loan)	2012–13	Southern League Division One Central	27	0	—		—		11 (Note: Two appearances in FA Cup qualifying rounds, three appearances in FA Trophy, two appearances in Herts Senior Cup, one appearance in Herts Charity Cup, one appearance in Hinchingbrooke Cup, one appearance in South Midlands Floodlit Cup, one appearance in Red Insure Cup)	0	38	0
Royston Town (loan)	2013–14	Southern League Division One Central	6	0	—		—		0	0	6	0
Royston Town (loan)	Total		33	0	—		—		11	0	44	0
Braintree Town (loan)	2015–16	National League	24	0	3	0	—		1 (Note: Appearance in FA Trophy)	0	28	0
Wolverhampton Wanderers	2017–18	Championship	1	0	2	0	4	0	—		7	0
Wolverhampton Wanderers	2018–19	Premier League	1	0	0	0	0	0	—		1	0
Wolverhampton Wanderers	Total		2	0	2	0	4	0	—		8	0
Ipswich Town (loan)	2019–20	League One	15	0	2	0	1	0	2 (Note: Appearances in EFL Trophy)	0	20	0
Burnley	2020–21	Premier League	2	0	1	0	0	0	—		3	0
Burnley	2021–22	Premier League	0	0	0	0	0	0	—		0	0
Burnley	2022–23	Championship	0	0	0	0	0	0	—		0	0
Burnley	Total		2	0	1	0	0	0	—		3	0
Peterborough United (loan)	2022–23	League One	24	0	0	0	0	0	0	0	24	0
Portsmouth	2023–24	League One	46	0	1	0	0	0	0	0	47	0
Portsmouth	2024–25	Championship	8	0	0	0	1	0	—		9	0
Portsmouth	Total		54	0	1	0	1	0	0	0	56	0
Wycombe Wanderers	2024–25	League One	17	0	1	0	0	0	1 (Note: One appearance in the League One Play-offs)	0	19	0
Wycombe Wanderers	2025–26	League One	34	0	1	0	4	0	1 (Note: One appearance in the EFL Trophy)	0	40	0
Wycombe Wanderers	Total		51	0	2	0	4	0	2	0	59	0
Career Total			332	0	15	0	11	0	38	0	396	0

== Honours ==
Royston Town

- Spartan South Midlands Football League Premier Division: 2011–12
- Spartan South Midlands Football League Premier Division Cup: 2011–12
- South Midlands Floodlit Cup: 2011–12
- Hinchingbrooke Cup: 2012–13

Cambridge United

- Conference Premier play-offs: 2014
- FA Trophy: 2013–14

Wolverhampton Wanderers

- EFL Championship: 2017–18

Portsmouth

- EFL League One: 2023–24

Individual

- National League Player of the Month: October 2015
- EFL League One Team of the Season: 2023–24
- PFA Team of the Year: 2023–24 League One
