= Toby Steward =

English footballer (born 2005)

Personal information
- Full name: Toby Peter Gary Steward
- Date of birth: 12 February 2005 (age 21)
- Place of birth: Winchester, England
- Height: 1.93 m (6 ft 4 in)
- Position: Goalkeeper

Team information
- Current team: St Johnstone (on loan from Portsmouth)
- Number: 1

Youth career
- –2022: Portsmouth

Senior career*
Years	Team	Apps	(Gls)
2022–	Portsmouth	0	(0)
2022	→ Bognor Regis Town (loan)	17	(0)
2023	→ Salisbury (loan)	1	(0)
2023–2024	→ Gosport Borough (loan)	41	(0)
2024	→ Tonbridge Angels (loan)	12	(0)
2024–2025	→ Wealdstone (loan)	6	(0)
2025	→ Crawley Town (loan)	4	(0)
2025–	→ St Johnstone (loan)	36	(0)
- * Club domestic league appearances and goals as of 4 May 2026

Toby Peter Gary Steward (born 12 February 2005) is an English professional footballer who plays as a goalkeeper for Scottish Premiership side St Johnstone, on loan from EFL Championship club Portsmouth.

== Career ==
Steward came through the football academy at Portsmouth, signing his first professional contract with the club in February 2022. In August 2022, he joined Bognor Regis Town on loan. He went on to make 26 appearances for the club in all competitions. In January 2023, he joined Salisbury on loan. In August 2023, he joined Gosport Borough and spent the entire season with the club. He signed a two-year contract extension with Portsmouth in May 2024.

He spent time during the 2024–25 season on loan at National League South club Tonbridge Angels and National League club Wealdstone prior to joining League One club Crawley Town on an emergency loan on 17 April 2025. The following day, he made his English Football League debut with a clean sheet in a 0–0 draw against Birmingham City. The loan was then extended for a further seven-days.

On 8 July 2025, Steward joined Scottish Championship club St Johnstone on a season-long loan deal. He made 45 appearances as St Johnstone won the Championship title, keeping a league record 20 clean sheets. In July 2026, he signed a new three-year contract with Portsmouth and joined St Johnstone for a second season-long loan.

== Personal life ==
From Portsmouth, Steward attended The Henry Cort Community College.

== Honours ==
St Johnstone

- Scottish Championship: 2025–26
