= Josh Dockerill =

English footballer (born 2004)

Personal information
- Full name: Joshua Dockerill
- Date of birth: 3 October 2004 (age 22)
- Place of birth: Guildford, England
- Height: 1.81 m (5 ft 11 in)
- Positions: Defender; midfielder

Youth career
- Aldershot Town
- Portsmouth

Senior career*
Years	Team	Apps	(Gls)
2022–2024	Portsmouth	0	(0)
2023	→ Bognor Regis Town (loan)	5	(0)
2024–2026	Havant & Waterlooville	39	(0)
2026	→ Basingstoke Town (loan)	3	(0)
- * Club domestic league appearances and goals as of 15:30, 16 April 2026 (UTC)

Joshua Dockerill (born 3 October 2004) is an English professional footballer who plays as a defender or midfielder. He is currently a free agent after playing for Southern League Premier Division South club Havant & Waterlooville.

== Career ==
Dockerill made his first-team debut for Portsmouth on 1 November 2022, after coming on as a 61st-minute substitute in a 1–1 draw with AFC Wimbledon in the EFL Trophy. On 31 March 2023, he was loaned to Bognor Regis Town. He played six games for Bognor before returning to Pompey in May, signing a professional contract with them on the 12th.

During a pre-season friendly against Gosport Borough in July 2023, Dockerill suffered a serious knee injury, damaging his anterior cruciate ligament as well as tearing his meniscus, an injury that would ultimately rule him out for the duration of the 2023–24 season.

On 1 May 2024, Portsmouth said the player would be released in the summer when his contract expired.

In July 2024, following a successful trial period, Dockerill joined Southern Premier Division South side Havant & Waterlooville.

In March 2026, Dockerill joined Southern Premier Division South side Basingstoke Town on loan for the remainder of the 2025/26 Season. Dockerill's season came to an early close following an acute fracture to his ankle in a match against Farnham Town on 21 March.

On 15 May 2026, Havant & Waterlooville said the player would be released in the summer when his contract expired.

== Style of play ==
Dockerill can play as a defender or as a midfielder, and is able to push forward from defence to help create attacks.

== Career statistics ==
As of 16 April 2026

Appearances and goals by club, season and competition
Club	Season	League			FA Cup		EFL Cup		Other		Total	
Club	Season	Division	Apps	Goals	Apps	Goals	Apps	Goals	Apps	Goals	Apps	Goals
Portsmouth	2022–23	League One	0	0	0	0	0	0	1 (Note: Appearance/s in the EFL Trophy)	0	1	0
Portsmouth	2023–24	League One	0	0	0	0	0	0	0	0	0	0
Portsmouth	Total		0	0	0	0	0	0	1	0	1	0
Bognor Regis Town (loan)	2022–23	Isthmian Premier Division	5	0	0	0	0	0	2 (Note: Appearance/s in the Sussex Senior Cup)	0	7	0
Havant & Waterlooville	2024–25	Southern Premier Division South	31	0	2	0	0	0	4 (Note: Appearance/s in the FA Trophy, PDFA Senior Cup and Hampshire Senior Cup)	0	37	0
Havant & Waterlooville	2025–26	Southern Premier Division South	8	0	0	0	0	0	5 (Note: Appearance/s in the FA Trophy and Hampshire Senior Cup)	0	13	0
Havant & Waterlooville	Total		39	0	2	0	0	0	9	0	50	0
Basingstoke Town (loan)	2025–26	Southern Premier Division South	3	0	0	0	0	0	0	0	3	0
Career total			47	0	2	0	0	0	12	0	61	0
