= Dane Scarlett =

English footballer (born 2004)

- Scarlett in 2026

Personal information
- Full name: Dane Pharrell Scarlett
- Date of birth: 24 March 2004 (age 22)
- Place of birth: Hillingdon, London, England
- Height: 5 ft 11 in (1.80 m)
- Position: Forward

Team information
- Current team: Leyton Orient
- Number: 18

Youth career
- –2020: Tottenham Hotspur

Senior career*
Years	Team	Apps	(Gls)
2020–2026	Tottenham Hotspur	11	(0)
2022–2023	→ Portsmouth (loan)	34	(4)
2023–2024	→ Ipswich Town (loan)	12	(0)
2024–2025	→ Oxford United (loan)	20	(4)
2026	→ Hibernian (loan)	13	(1)
2026–	Leyton Orient	7	(1)

International career^{‡}
2019	England U15	2	(1)
2019	England U16	2	(2)
2021–2022	England U19	14	(12)
2022–2025	England U20	22	(10)
2023–2024	England U21	5	(2)
Medal record
Men's football
Representing England
UEFA European Under-19 Championship
Winner	2022 Slovakia
- * Club domestic league appearances and goals as of 21:20, 25 October 2025 ‡ National team caps and goals as of 10:14, 10 April 2025 (UTC)

Dane Pharrell Scarlett (born 24 March 2004) is an English professional footballer who plays as a forward for EFL League One club Leyton Orient.

Scarlett has represented England up to under-21 level and was a member of the 2022 UEFA European Under-19 Championship-winning squad. He began his domestic career at Tottenham Hotspur, becoming the club's youngest appearance maker at 16 years and 247 days during a UEFA Europa League match in November 2020. He made his Premier League debut three months later. He spent the 2022–23 season on loan at Portsmouth in League One. He spent the early parts of the 2023–24 and 2024–25 campaigns on loan at Championship clubs Ipswich Town and Oxford United.

== Club career ==
Scarlett was part of the Tottenham Hotspur Under-18s team in the 2019–20 season; however, the season ended prematurely for him after he sustained a knee injury. He started playing with the first team in pre-season friendly matches in August 2020 and returned to the Under-18s at the start of the 2020–21 season. He scored ten goals and made three assists in eight games; four goals, three of them headers, were scored on 21 November in a 7–0 win over Southampton.

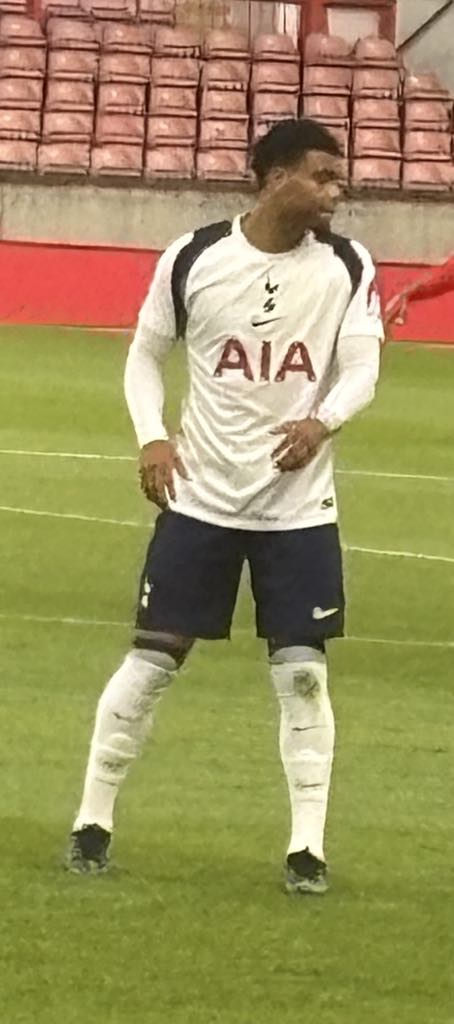
Scarlett with the Tottenham Hotspur U21s in 2025

He first appeared on the first-team bench at Tottenham Hotspur Stadium in a UEFA Europa League game against Ludogorets Razgrad on 26 November, and he made his debut after coming on as a substitute for Lucas Moura. At the age of 16 years and 247 days, this made him the youngest player to have appeared in a senior first-team competitive game for Tottenham, beating the previous record held by John Bostock. The record lasted until 10 January 2021 when Alfie Devine made his debut at the age of 16 years and 163 days. On 12 January 2021, Scarlett scored five goals for the Under-18 team in a 6–2 win over Newport County in the FA Youth Cup. He made his Premier League debut on 7 February 2021, coming off the bench during stoppage time against West Bromwich Albion. Manager José Mourinho said, "I wanted to be the one to put him on in a Premier League match. Because I know that he will be somebody in a few years." On 24 February, he became the youngest player to make an assist in the Europa League since Kylian Mbappé in a 4–0 win against Wolfsberger AC, teeing up Carlos Vinícius for the goal. On 28 March 2021, Scarlett signed his first professional contract with Tottenham Hotspur.

Having enjoyed a promising pre-season, Scarlett was seen as having "big, big expectations" by new manager Nuno Espírito Santo. Scarlett made his first start for Spurs on 19 August 2021 in the inaugural UEFA Europa Conference League competition, playing in a 1–0 defeat to Paços de Ferreira. New manager Antonio Conte said that Scarlett was "the best prospect from the academy" in February 2022. The following month, Conte urged the player to show patience with his lack of game time as he had noticed that he was "improving a lot". He played seven first-team games for Spurs during the 2021–22 season, after which Scarlett signed a new contract to run until 2026.

On 27 July 2022, Scarlett was loaned to League One side Portsmouth for the 2022–23 season. He scored his first professional goal in a 1–0 win at Port Vale on 27 August. On 3 September, he scored both Pompey's goals in a 2–1 win over Peterborough United at Fratton Park to conclude a run of four goals in three games. Manager Danny Cowley said that he was the best defensive forward he had seen in 15 years. Cowley was sacked on 2 January. His successor, John Mousinho, later admitted that Scarlett "struggled to get a place" in the first XI, however, showing "how competitive it is in league football". Interim manager Simon Bassey mused that "sometimes, failure is good... I am sure Dane is going to be a good player". Scarlett ended the campaign with six goals in 40 appearances. Spurs interim manager Ryan Mason said that he had returned as a physically stronger player.

On 31 August 2023, Scarlett signed a new contract with Tottenham to run until 2027 and joined Championship side Ipswich Town on loan until the end of the 2023–24 season. He made 12 substitute appearances for the Tractor Boys, before being recalled from his loan on 27 December because of a lack of playing time as Kieran McKenna's side were going strong in the automatic promotion places. He returned to the Spurs team for their third round FA Cup game against Burnley, coming on in the 83rd-minute as a substitute for Richarlison.

On 12 August 2024, he returned to the Championship on a season-long loan at Oxford United. He scored his first goal for the U's, an injury-time equaliser, against West Bromwich Albion on 19 October. He struggled for playing time under manager Des Buckingham due to the form of Mark Harris. He featured even less, however, after Gary Rowett replaced Buckingham as manager and signed both Ole Romeny and Tom Bradshaw in the January transfer window. Scarlett was recalled from his loan by Tottenham on 20 January, having scored four goals in 22 games for Oxford. Ten days later Scarlett scored his first goal for Spurs when he headed home the opening goal of a 3–0 win against IF Elfsborg in the last match of the league phase of the UEFA Europa League. He played five games for Spurs in the 2024–25 campaign, and Ange Postecoglou revealed in May that Scarlett had undergone surgery after carrying a groin injury all year.

Scarlett made five substitute appearances for Tottenham during the 2025–26 season, before he was loaned to Scottish Premiership club Hibernian on 30 January.

On 1 September 2026, Scarlett joined EFL League One club Leyton Orient.

== International career ==
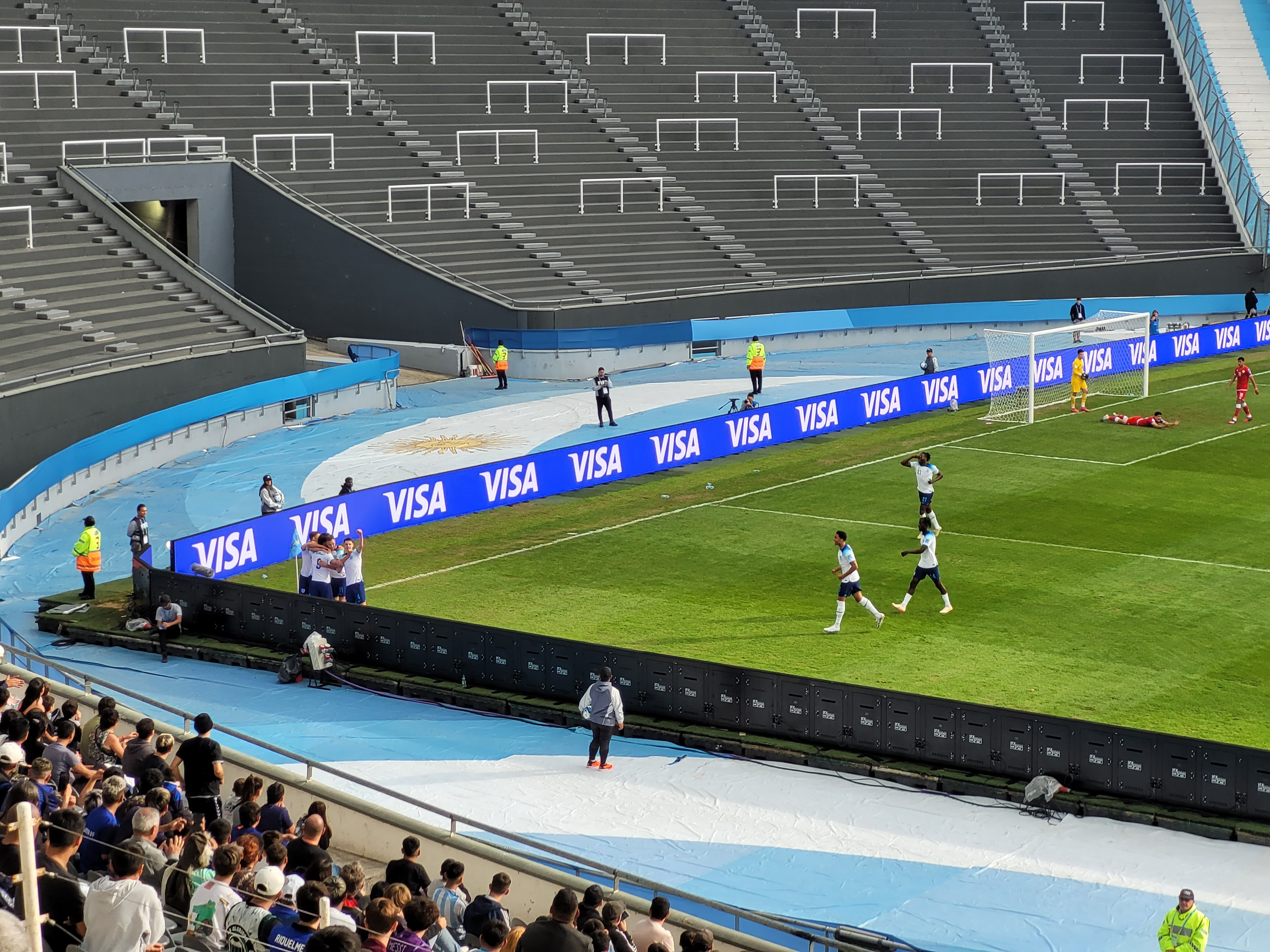
Scarlett celebrates his goal against Tunisia with his teammates.

Born in England, Scarlett is of Jamaican descent. He made one appearance for the England U16 team in August 2019, playing against Denmark, where he scored both goals in a 2–0 win. On 2 September 2021, Scarlett scored on his debut for the England U19s in a 2–0 victory over Italy at St. George's Park. On 17 June 2022, Scarlett was included in the squad for the 2022 UEFA European Under-19 Championship. He scored twice in a group stage match against Serbia. He started in the final as England won the tournament with a 3–1 extra time victory over Israel on 1 July.

On 21 September 2022, he made his England U20 debut as a substitute during a 3–0 victory over Chile at the Pinatar Arena. On 10 May 2023, he was included in the England squad for the 2023 FIFA U-20 World Cup. He scored the winning goal in their opening group game against Tunisia and also played in their round of sixteen elimination against Italy. On 11 September 2023, he made his England U21 debut as a substitute during a 3–0 win away at Luxembourg in a UEFA European Under-21 Championship qualification match.

== Style of play ==
Scarlett is a centre-forward with excellent off-the-ball movement and positional skills, as well as good athletic attributes.

== Career statistics ==
As of end of 2025–26 season

Appearances and goals by club, season and competition
Club	Season	League			National cup (Note: Includes FA Cup)		League cup (Note: Includes EFL Cup)		Europe		Other		Total	
Club	Season	Division	Apps	Goals	Apps	Goals	Apps	Goals	Apps	Goals	Apps	Goals	Apps	Goals
Tottenham Hotspur U21	2021–22	—			—		—		—		1 (Note: Appearance(s) in EFL Trophy)	1	1	1
Tottenham Hotspur	2020–21	Premier League	1	0	0	0	0	0	2 (Note: Appearances in UEFA Europa League)	0	—		3	0
Tottenham Hotspur	2021–22	Premier League	1	0	2	0	0	0	4 (Note: Appearances in UEFA Europa Conference League)	0	—		7	0
Tottenham Hotspur	2023–24	Premier League	4	0	2	0	1	0	—		—		7	0
Tottenham Hotspur	2024–25	Premier League	3	0	—		—		2	1	—		5	1
Tottenham Hotspur	2025–26	Premier League	2	0	1	0	0	0	2 (Note: Appearances in UEFA Champions League)	0	0	0	5	0
Tottenham Hotspur	Total		11	0	5	0	1	0	10	1	0	0	27	1
Portsmouth (loan)	2022–23	League One	34	4	0	0	2	0	—		4	2	40	6
Ipswich Town (loan)	2023–24	Championship	12	0	—		0	0	—		—		12	0
Oxford United (loan)	2024–25	Championship	20	4	1	0	1	0	—		—		22	4
Hibernian (loan)	2025–26	Scottish Premiership	13	1	—		—		—		—		13	0
Leyton Orient	2026–27	League One	0	0	0	0	0	0	—		0	0	0	0
Total			90	9	6	0	4	0	10	1	5	3	115	12

== Honours ==
Tottenham Hotspur

- UEFA Europa League: 2024–25

England U19s

- UEFA European Under-19 Championship: 2022
