= 2022–23 Portsmouth F.C. season =

Portsmouth FC
2022–23 season
- Owner-Chairman: Michael Eisner
- Chief Executive Officer: Andrew Cullen
- Head Coach: Danny Cowley (until 2 January); John Mousinho (from 20 January)
- Stadium: Fratton Park
- League One: 8th (70 points)
- FA Cup: Third round
- EFL Cup: Second round
- EFL Trophy: Quarter-finals
- Top goalscorer: League: Colby Bishop (20); All: Colby Bishop (24)
- Highest home attendance: 19,009 vs. Plymouth Argyle (17 September 2022)
- Lowest home attendance: 16,434 vs. Burton (14 February 2023)
- Biggest win: 4–0 vs. Cheltenham Town (H) (25 February 2023)
- Biggest defeat: 3–0 vs. Charlton (A) (17 October 2022)
Home colours	Away colours	Third colours

The 2022–23 season was Portsmouth's sixth consecutive season in League One. Along with the league, the club also competed in the FA Cup, the EFL Cup and the EFL Trophy. The season commenced on 30 July 2022.

Portsmouth F.C. became 125 years old on 5 April 2023.

== Players ==
=== Squad ===
As of 24 January 2026

Note: Flags indicate national team as defined under FIFA eligibility rules; some limited exceptions apply. Players may hold more than one non-FIFA nationality.

No.	Pos.	Nation	Player
1	GK	ENG	Matt Macey (on loan from Luton Town)
2	DF	ENG	Zak Swanson
3	DF	ENG	Denver Hume
4	DF	SCO	Clark Robertson (captain)
6	DF	ENG	Connor Ogilvie
7	MF	ENG	Marlon Pack
8	MF	ENG	Ryan Tunnicliffe
9	FW	ENG	Colby Bishop
10	FW	ENG	Joe Pigott (on loan from Ipswich Town)
11	FW	IRL	Ronan Curtis
13	DF	WAL	Kieron Freeman
14	FW	ENG	Jayden Reid
15	FW	ENG	Owen Dale (on loan from Blackpool)
16	MF	WAL	Joe Morrell

No.	Pos.	Nation	Player
17	DF	IRL	Joe Rafferty
18	FW	LCA	Reeco Hackett
19	FW	ENG	Dane Scarlett (on loan from Tottenham Hotspur)
20	DF	ENG	Sean Raggett
21	GK	NGR	Josh Oluwayemi
22	DF	ENG	Liam Vincent
23	MF	WAL	Louis Thompson
24	FW	ENG	Michael Jacobs
25	MF	ENG	Jay Mingi
26	MF	WAL	Tom Lowery
28	DF	JAM	Di'Shon Bernard (on loan from Manchester United)
29	FW	NIR	Paddy Lane
33	GK	ENG	Toby Steward
34	DF	ENG	Ryley Towler

== Transfers ==
=== In ===
No.	Pos.	Player	Transferred From	Fee	Date	Source
7	MF	(England) Marlon Pack	(Wales) Cardiff City	Free Transfer	22 June 2022	
2	DF	(England) Zak Swanson	(England) Arsenal	Undisclosed	4 July 2022	
17	DF	(Republic of Ireland) Joe Rafferty	(England) Preston North End	Free Transfer	11 July 2022	
21	GK	(Nigeria) Josh Oluwayemi	(England) Tottenham Hotspur	Free Transfer	19 July 2022	
9	FW	(England) Colby Bishop	(England) Accrington Stanley	Undisclosed	21 July 2022	
28	DF	(England) Michael Morrison	(England) Reading	Free Transfer	26 July 2022	
26	MF	(Wales) Tom Lowery	(England) Crewe Alexandra	Free Transfer	5 August 2022	
34	DF	(England) Ryley Towler	(England) Bristol City	Undisclosed	6 January 2023	
29	FW	(Northern Ireland) Paddy Lane	(England) Fleetwood Town	Undisclosed	31 January 2023	

=== Out ===
No.	Pos.	Player	Transferred to	Fee	Date	Source
26	DF	(England) Paul Downing	Unattached	End of Contract	30 June 2022	
2	DF	(England) Callum Johnson	(Scotland) Ross County	End of Contract	30 June 2022	
7	FW	(Republic of Ireland) Aiden O'Brien	(England) Shrewsbury Town	End of Contract	30 June 2022	
28	GK	(England) Ollie Webber	(Northern Ireland) Glentoran	End of Contract	30 June 2022	
6	MF	(Republic of Ireland) Shaun Williams	(England) Gillingham	End of Contract	30 June 2022	
10	FW	(Republic of Ireland) Marcus Harness	(England) Ipswich Town	Undisclosed	16 July 2022	
35	GK	(England) Alex Bass	(England) Sunderland	Undisclosed	26 July 2022	
28	DF	(England) Michael Morrison	(England) Cambridge United	Free Transfer	26 January 2023	

=== Loaned in ===
No.	Pos.	Player	Loaned From	Until	Date	Source
1	GK	(England) Josh Griffiths	(England) West Bromwich Albion	11 January 2023 (Note: On 11 January, Griffiths was recalled back to West Brom)	14 July 2022	
10	FW	(England) Joe Pigott	(England) Ipswich Town	End of Season	16 July 2022	
19	FW	(England) Dane Scarlett	(England) Tottenham Hotspur	End of Season	27 July 2022	
15	FW	(England) Owen Dale	(England) Blackpool	End of Season	7 August 2022	
27	FW	(Sierra Leone) Josh Koroma	(England) Huddersfield Town	11 January 2023 (Note: On 11 January, Portsmouth opted to end Koroma's loan from Huddersfield)	1 September 2022	
1	GK	(England) Matt Macey	(England) Luton Town	End of Season	20 January 2023	
28	DF	(Jamaica) Di'Shon Bernard	(England) Manchester United	End of Season	31 January 2023	

=== Loaned out ===
No.	Pos.	Player	Loaned to	Until	Date	Source
22	DF	(England) Liam Vincent	(England) Maidstone United	2 September 2022	5 August 2022	
31	MF	(Malta) Alfie Bridgman	(England) Bognor Regis Town	12 September 2022	12 August 2022	
33	GK	(England) Toby Steward	(England) Bognor Regis Town	1 January 2023	12 August 2022	
32	MF	(England) Dan Gifford	(England) Weymouth	16 September 2022	16 August 2022	
30	MF	(Wales) Harry Jewitt-White	(England) Gosport Borough	16 September 2022	16 August 2022	
5	DF	(Tanzania) Haji Mnoga	(England) Gillingham	17 January 2023 (Note: Mnoga returned from his loan at Gillingham and joined Aldershot)	1 September 2022	
22	DF	(England) Liam Vincent	(England) Worthing	End of Season	13 January 2023	
5	DF	(Tanzania) Haji Mnoga	(England) Aldershot Town	End of Season	17 January 2023	

== Pre-season and friendlies ==
On 17 May, Pompey announced their first batch of pre-season friendlies with trips to Havant & Waterlooville, Gosport Borough and Gillingham, with an XI side also travelling to Bognor Regis Town. A week later, a trip to face Leyton Orient was also added to the schedule. A home pre-season friendly was confirmed on June 8, against Coventry City. A further away pre-season friendly was confirmed on 17 June, against Bristol City. A Pompey XI side would also face Barnet prior to the new season. A training camp match in Spain against Qatar SC was also added.

Win Draw Loss Fixtures

2 July 2022 Friendly	Havant & Waterlooville	0–3	Portsmouth	Havant
15:00 BST		Report	Tunnicliffe 34'; Curtis 40'; Vincent 48'	Stadium: Westleigh Park; Attendance: 3,000; Referee: Matt Russell

3 July 2022 Friendly	Gosport Borough	1–0	Portsmouth	Gosport
15:00 BST	Robinson 13'	Report		Stadium: Privett Park; Referee: Dean Treleaven

9 July 2022 Friendly	Qatar SC	0–2	Portsmouth	San Pedro del Pinatar, Spain
16:00 CEST		Report	Trialist 69'; Bridgman 84'	Stadium: Pinatar Arena; Referee: Roca Robles

12 July 2022 Friendly	Bristol City	0–0	Portsmouth	Failand
14:00 BST		Report		Stadium: Robins High Performance Centre; Attendance: 0 (behind-closed-doors); Referee: Ross Martin
Note: 120-minutes, split into three periods.

16 July 2022 Friendly	Gillingham	1–2	Portsmouth	Gillingham
15:00 BST	Lee 70'	Report	Hackett-Fairchild 27'; Ogilvie 90'	Stadium: Priestfield Stadium; Attendance: 1,356; Referee: Tim Robinson

19 July 2022 Friendly	Leyton Orient	2–5	Portsmouth	Leyton
19:00 BST	Smyth 44'; Happe 72'	Report	Ogie 16' (o.g.); Pigott 18', 74'; Pack 52'; Curtis 53' (pen.)	Stadium: Breyer Group Stadium; Referee: Gavin Ward

20 July 2022 Friendly	Bognor Regis Town	1–1	Portsmouth XI	Bognor Regis
19:45 BST	Dembele 20'	Report	Jewitt-White 38'	Stadium: Nyewood Lane; Attendance: Unknown; Referee: Alex Bradley

23 July 2022 Friendly	Portsmouth	0–2	Coventry City	Portsmouth
15:00 BST		Report	Gyökeres 54'; Panzo 72'	Stadium: Fratton Park; Attendance: 5,694; Referee: Charles Breakspear

26 July 2022 Friendly	Barnet	2–3	Portsmouth XI	Canons Park
19:30 BST	Kabamba 12'; De Havilland 87'	Report	Jewitt-White 25'; Swanson 55'; Gifford 89'	Stadium: The Hive; Referee: Tom Healy

Mid-season

23 September 2022 Friendly	Chelsea XI	2–4	Portsmouth	Cobham
13:00 BST		Report	Pigott,, Curtis	Stadium: Cobham Training Centre

== Competitions ==
=== Overall record ===
Competition	Starting round	Final position	Record							
Competition	Starting round	Final position	Pld	W	D	L	GF	GA	GD	Win %
EFL League One	Matchday 1	8th	46	17	19	10	61	50	+11	36.96
FA Cup	First round	Third round	3	2	0	1	6	4	+2	66.67
EFL Cup	First round	Second round	2	1	0	1	5	3	+2	50.00
EFL Trophy	Group stage	Quarter Final	6	3	2	1	13	4	+9	50.00
Total			57	23	21	13	85	61	+24	40.35

Last updated: 28 January 2026
Source: Soccerway

=== EFL League One ===
==== League table ====
Pos	Team	Pld	W	D	L	GF	GA	GD	Pts	Promotion, qualification or relegation
5	Bolton Wanderers	46	23	12	11	62	36	+26	81	Qualification for League One play-offs
6	Peterborough United	46	24	5	17	75	54	+21	77	Qualification for League One play-offs
7	Derby County	46	21	13	12	67	46	+21	76	
8	Portsmouth	46	17	19	10	61	50	+11	70	
9	Wycombe Wanderers	46	20	9	17	59	51	+8	69	
10	Charlton Athletic	46	16	14	16	70	66	+4	62	
11	Lincoln City	46	14	20	12	47	47	0	62	

Source: EFL Official Website
Rules for classification: 1) Points; 2) Goal difference; 3) Number of goals scored; 4) Head-to-head results; 5) Wins; 6) Away goals; 7) Penalty points (sec 9.5); 8) 12-point sending off offences

==== Results summary ====
Overall								Home						Away					
Pld	W	D	L	GF	GA	GD	Pts	W	D	L	GF	GA	GD	W	D	L	GF	GA	GD
45	17	18	10	59	48	+11	69	9	10	3	32	20	+12	8	8	7	27	28	−1

Last updated: 29 April 2023.
Source: [Soccerway]

==== League results by round ====
Round	1	2	3	4	5	6	7	9	10	12	13	14	15	16	17	18	19	20	22	23	24	25	27	28	26^{1}	29	30	31	32	33	34	11^{2}	35	8^{3}	36	21^{4}	37	38	39	40	41	42	43	44	45	46
Ground	A	H	A	H	H	A	H	A	H	A	H	A	A	H	H	A	H	A	H	A	H	H	A	H	A	A	H	A	H	A	H	H	A	A	H	A	A	H	H	A	H	A	A	H	A	H
Result	D	D	W	W	W	W	W	W	D	L	D	L	W	D	D	D	D	L	L	D	D	L	L	W	W	L	D	L	W	D	W	W	W	L	L	W	W	D	W	D	D	D	D	W	D	D
Position	8	18	9	3	3	1	2	2	3	4	4	5	5	6	5	5	5	8	10	11	10	12	15	15	10	11	10	11	10	10	10	10	10	10	10	10	10	9	9	9	9	9	9	9	8	8
Points	1	2	5	8	11	14	17	20	21	21	22	22	25	26	27	28	29	29	29	30	31	31	31	34	37	37	38	38	41	42	45	48	51	51	51	54	57	58	61	62	63	64	65	68	69	70

Updated to match(es) played on 7 May 2023. Source: Soccerway
A = Away; H = Home; W = Win; D = Draw; L = Loss; P = Postponed
Notes:
- ^{1} Matchday 8 (vs. Barnsley) postponed as a mark of respect following the passing of Queen Elizabeth II.
- ^{2} Matchday 11 (vs. Bolton Wanderers) was postponed due to international call-ups in the Bolton squad.
- ^{3} Matchday 21 (vs. Accrington Stanley) was postponed due to a frozen pitch.
- ^{4} Matchday 26 (vs. Fleetwood Town) was postponed due to both teams reaching the third round of the FA Cup.

==== Matches ====
Win Draw Loss Fixtures

On 23 June, the league fixtures were announced.

30 July 2022 1	Sheffield Wednesday	3–3	Portsmouth	Owlerton
15:00 BST	Johnson 8'; Windass (yellow card) 13'; Byers (yellow card) 49'; Dele-Bashiru 52', 81'; Gregory (yellow card) 82', (red card) 90+3'; Ihiekwe (yellow card) 90+1'; Stockdale (yellow card) 90+3'	Report	Ogilvie 50'; Jacobs 57'; Bishop 64'	Stadium: Hillsborough Stadium; Attendance: 26,901; Referee: Sebastian Stockbridge

6 August 2022 2	Portsmouth	0–0	Lincoln City	Portsmouth
15:00 BST		Report	Sanders (yellow card) 41'; Sørensen (yellow card) 87'	Stadium: Fratton Park; Attendance: 17,855; Referee: David Rock

13 August 2022 3	Cheltenham Town	0–2	Portsmouth	Cheltenham
15:00 BST	N'Lundulu (yellow card) 25'; Bonds (yellow card) 59'	Report	Bishop 30', 56'; Dale (yellow card) 78'	Stadium: Whaddon Road; Attendance: 4,649; Referee: Ben Toner

16 August 2022 4	Portsmouth	4–1	Cambridge United	Portsmouth
19:45 BST	Bishop 45+3'; Curtis 60'; Jacobs 70'; Ogilvie 77'	Report	O'Neil (yellow card) 3'; Ironside 30'; Jones (yellow card) 45'; Okedina (yellow card) 64'	Stadium: Fratton Park; Attendance: 17,702; Referee: Chris Pollard

20 August 2022 5	Portsmouth	3–1	Bristol Rovers	Portsmouth
15:00 BST	Ogilvie 32'; Pigott 82'; Dale 90+2'	Report	Collins 61'	Stadium: Fratton Park; Attendance: 18,842; Referee: Gavin Ward

27 August 2022 6	Port Vale	0–1	Portsmouth	Stoke-on-Trent
15:00 BST	Massey (yellow card) 71'; Ojo (yellow card) 84'	Report	Scarlett 25'; Lowery (yellow card) 61'	Stadium: Vale Park; Attendance: 8,878; Referee: Craig Hicks

3 September 2022 7	Portsmouth	2–1	Peterborough United	Portsmouth
15:00 BST	Scarlett 38', 70'; Rafferty (yellow card) 61'; Robertson (yellow card) 90+5'	Report	Marriott 5'; Kent (yellow card) 64'	Stadium: Fratton Park; Attendance: 18,168; Referee: Sam Barrott

10 September 2022	Barnsley	Postponed	Portsmouth	Barnsley
15:00 BST				Stadium: Oakwell Stadium
Note: Fixture was postponed as a mark of respect following the passing of Queen Elizabeth II.

13 September 2022 8	Burton Albion	0–2	Portsmouth	Burton upon Trent
19:45 BST	Gilligan (yellow card) 28'; Taylor (yellow card) 57'	Report	Raggett (yellow card) 53'; Hughes 59' (o.g.); Bishop 86'	Stadium: Pirelli Stadium; Attendance: 2,945; Referee: Robert Lewis

17 September 2022 9	Portsmouth	2–2	Plymouth Argyle	Portsmouth
15:00 BST	Koroma 41'; Pack (yellow card) 43'; Hackett-Fairchild (yellow card) 90+3', (goal) 90+4'; Bishop (yellow card) 90+3'; Morrison (yellow card) 90+4'	Report	Raggett 74' (o.g.); Ennis 79'; Galloway (yellow card) 89' (yellow-red card) 90+3'; Azaz (yellow card) 90+2'	Stadium: Fratton Park; Attendance: 19,009; Referee: James Bell

24 September 2022	Portsmouth	Postponed	Bolton Wanderers	Portsmouth
15:00 BST				Stadium: Fratton Park
Note: Fixture was postponed after international call-ups in the Bolton squad.

1 October 2022 10	Ipswich Town	3–2	Portsmouth	Ipswich
15:00 BST	Harness 25'; Walton (yellow card) 31'; Ladapo 74'; Burns 80'	Report	Scarlett (yellow card) 10'; Bishop 32' (pen.) 79' (pen.); Robertson (yellow card) 85'	Stadium: Portman Road; Attendance: 28,434; Referee: Charles Breakspear

8 October 2022 11	Portsmouth	1–1	Fleetwood Town	Portsmouth
15:00 BST	Koroma 7'; Morrell (yellow card) 65'; Raggett (yellow card) 78'	Report	Rooney (yellow card) 10'; Mendes Gomes 15' (yellow card) 32'; Earl (yellow card) 57'; Batty (yellow card) 83'; Vela (yellow card) 90+2'	Stadium: Fratton Park; Attendance: 18,271; Referee: James Oldham

17 October 2022 12	Charlton Athletic	3–0	Portsmouth	Charlton
20:00 BST	Inniss 17'; Blackett-Taylor 31'; O'Connell 67'; Sessegnon (yellow card) 70'; Dobson (yellow card) 84'; Morgan (yellow card) 88'	Report	Pack (yellow card) 30' (yellow-red card) 66'; Morrell (yellow card) 70'	Stadium: The Valley; Referee: Dean Whitestone
Note: This match was broadcast live on Sky Sports.

22 October 2022 13	Forest Green Rovers	0–1	Portsmouth	Nailsworth
15:00 BST	Hendry (yellow card) 21'; Little (yellow card) 74'; Cargill (yellow card) 90+2'	Report	Tunnicliffe (yellow card) 14'; Raggett 17'; Scarlett (yellow card) 65'	Stadium: The Fully Charged New Lawn; Attendance: 4,011; Referee: Will Finnie

25 October 2022 14	Portsmouth	1–1	Oxford United	Portsmouth
19:45 BST	Curtis (yellow card) 45+2'; Bishop 78'	Report	Joseph 16'; Bodin (yellow card) 41' (yellow-red card) 71'; Findlay (yellow card) 65'; O'Donkor (yellow card) 69'; Goodrham (yellow card) 85'	Stadium: Fratton Park; Attendance: 18,277; Referee: Sam Purkiss

29 October 2022 15	Portsmouth	1–1	Shrewsbury Town	Portsmouth
15:00 BST	Mingi (yellow card) 8'; Swanson 29'	Report	Bennett 26'	Stadium: Fratton Park; Attendance: 17,792; Referee: Tom Reeves

12 November 2022 16	Morecambe	1–1	Portsmouth	Morecambe
15:00 GMT	Shaw 36'; Love (yellow card) 72'; Connolly (yellow card) 90+4'	Report	Pack (yellow card) 15'; Bishop 67'; Mingi (yellow card) 90+6'; Hume (yellow card) 90+6'	Stadium: Mazuma Stadium; Attendance: 4,726; Referee: Adam Herczeg

18 November 2022 17	Portsmouth	0–0	Derby County	Portsmouth
20:00 GMT	Robertson (yellow card) 12'; Bishop (yellow card) 71'	Report	Sibley (yellow card) 38'; Cashin (yellow card) 63'; Thompson (yellow card) 73'; Dobbin (yellow card) 90+1'	Stadium: Fratton Park; Attendance: 18,623; Referee: Neil Hair
Note: This match will be broadcast live on Sky Sports.

4 December 2022 18	Wycombe Wanderers	2–0	Portsmouth	Wycombe
12:30 GMT	Mehmeti 14'; Mawson (yellow card) 54'; McCleary 88'	Report	Ogilvie (yellow card) 39'; Robertson (yellow card) 67'	Stadium: Adams Park; Attendance: 6,306; Referee: Scott Oldham
Note: This match will be broadcast live on Sky Sports.

10 December 2022	Accrington Stanley	Postponed	Portsmouth	Accrington
15:00 GMT				Stadium: Wham Stadium
Note: Fixture was postponed due to a frozen pitch.

17 December 2022 19	Portsmouth	0–2	Milton Keynes Dons	Portsmouth
15:00 GMT	Hackett-Fairchild (yellow card) 56'; Dale (yellow card) 58'; Ogilvie (yellow card) 70'	Report	Jules (yellow card) 28'; Johnson 34'; Tucker 64'	Stadium: Fratton Park; Attendance: 17,426; Referee: Sam Barrott

26 December 2022 20	Exeter City	0–0	Portsmouth	Exeter
15:00 GMT	Stansfield (yellow card) 31'; Sparkes (yellow card) 79'; Collins (yellow card) 90+2'	Report	Dale (yellow card) 40'; Morrison (yellow card) 58'; Morrell (yellow card) 84'	Stadium: St James Park; Attendance: 7,779; Referee: Robert Lewis

29 December 2022 21	Portsmouth	2–2	Ipswich Town	Portsmouth
15:00 GMT	Pack 4' (yellow card) 78'; Bishop 61'	Report	Burgess 11' (yellow card) 16'; Chaplin 88'	Stadium: Fratton Park; Attendance: 18,849; Referee: Sam Allison

1 January 2023 22	Portsmouth	1–3	Charlton Athletic	Portsmouth
15:00 GMT	Ogilvie 45+3'; Pack (yellow card) 63' (yellow-red card) 69'; Dale 90+3' (o.g.)	Report	Rak-Sakyi 23'; Fraser 48'	Stadium: Fratton Park; Attendance: 18,468; Referee: Tom Reeves

7 January 2023	Fleetwood Town	Postponed	Portsmouth	Fleetwood
15:00 BST				Stadium: Highbury Stadium
Note: The match was due to take place at Highbury Stadium on Saturday, January 7, but was postponed when both sides reached the third round of the FA Cup.

14 January 2023 23	Bolton Wanderers	3–0	Portsmouth	Horwich
15:00 GMT	Charles 15'; Lee 48'; Toal 71'	Report	Morrell (yellow card) 85'	Stadium: University of Bolton Stadium; Attendance: 17,977; Referee: Geoff Eltringham

21 January 2023 24	Portsmouth	2–0	Exeter City	Portsmouth
15:00 GMT	Pack 57'; Morrell 74'; Thompson (yellow card) 84'	Report	Hartridge (yellow card) 70'; Key (yellow card) 85'	Stadium: Fratton Park; Attendance: 18,719; Referee: Oliver Yates

24 January 2023 25	Fleetwood Town	0–2	Portsmouth	Fleetwood
19:45 GMT	Nsiala (yellow card) 47'; Sarpong-Wiredu (yellow card) 63'	Report	Bishop 43' (yellow card) 57'; Morrell (yellow card) 63' (yellow-red card) 68'; Pigott 83'; Swanson (yellow card) 89'; Ogilvie (yellow card) 90+1'	Stadium: Highbury Stadium; Attendance: 2,938; Referee: Anthony Backhouse

28 January 2023 26	Peterborough United	2–1	Portsmouth	Peterborough
15:00 GMT	Clarke-Harris 18', 44' (pen.), (yellow card) 50'; Kyprianou (yellow card) 31'	Report	Thompson (yellow card) 58'; Pack (yellow card) 69'; Thompson 87' (o.g.)	Stadium: Weston Homes Stadium; Attendance: 8,909; Referee: Bobby Madley

4 February 2023 27	Portsmouth	1–1	Barnsley	Portsmouth
15:00 GMT	Bishop 49'	Report	Cadden (yellow card) 86'; Thomas 89'	Stadium: Fratton Park; Attendance: 17,854; Referee: Andy Woolmer

11 February 2023 28	Plymouth Argyle	3–1	Portsmouth	Plymouth
15:00 GMT	Cosgrove 24'; Azaz 70'; Matete (yellow card) 73'; Butcher (yellow card) 76'; Hardie 90+4'	Report	Hackett-Fairchild 79'; Raggett (yellow card) 85'; Bishop (yellow card) 87'	Stadium: Home Park; Attendance: 16,734; Referee: Simon Mather

14 February 2023 29	Portsmouth	1–0	Burton Albion	Portsmouth
19:45 GMT	Scarlett 90+2'	Report	Ashworth (yellow card) 36'; Moon (yellow card) 45+1'; Oshilaja (yellow card) 45+2'; Hughes (yellow card) 70'	Stadium: Fratton Park; Attendance: 16,434; Referee: Tim Robinson

18 February 2023 30	Lincoln City	0–0	Portsmouth	Lincoln
15:00 GMT	Mandroiu (yellow card) 45+3'; Eyoma (yellow card) 90+2'	Report	Morrell (yellow card) 5'; Rafferty (yellow card) 33'; Hackett-Fairchild (yellow card) 56'; Pigott (yellow card) 66'	Stadium: LNER Stadium; Attendance: 9,906 (1,313 Pompey fans); Referee: Ross Joyce

25 February 2023 31	Portsmouth	4–0	Cheltenham Town	Portsmouth
15:00 GMT	Tunnicliffe 5'; Jacobs 20'; Curtis 26'; Ogilvie (yellow card) 60'; Thompson 90+1'	Report	Bonds (yellow card) 14'; Long (yellow card) 29'; Raglan (yellow card) 33'; Keena (yellow card) 41'; Taylor (yellow card) 45+2'	Stadium: Fratton Park; Attendance: 17,504; Referee: Lee Swabey

28 February 2023 32	Portsmouth	3–1	Bolton Wanderers	Portsmouth
19:45 GMT	Curtis (yellow card) 71'; Towler 73', 84'; Bishop 87'	Report	Santos (yellow card) 13'; Bradley (yellow card) 27'; Charles 48'; Lee (yellow card) 57'; Toal (yellow card) 73'	Stadium: Fratton Park; Attendance: 17,132; Referee: Stephen Martin

4 March 2023 33	Cambridge United	0–1	Portsmouth	Cambridge
15:00 GMT	Lankester (yellow card) 36'	Report	Dale (yellow card) 43'; Bishop 65'	Stadium: Abbey Stadium; Attendance: 6,667; Referee: Andrew Kitchen

7 March 2023 34	Barnsley	3–1	Portsmouth	Barnsley
19:45 GMT	Norwood 17'; Cadden 20'; Kitching (yellow card) 37'; Cole 60'		Bishop 49'	Stadium: Oakwell; Attendance: 10,968; Referee: Marc Edwards

11 March 2023 35	Portsmouth	0–1	Sheffield Wednesday	Portsmouth
15:00 GMT	Morrell (yellow card) 41'; Raggett (yellow card) 87'	Report	Windass 11', (yellow card) 41'; Brown (yellow card) 43'; Iorfa (yellow card) 54' (yellow-red card) 78'	Stadium: Fratton Park; Attendance: 18,910 (1,594 away fans); Referee: Ben Toner

14 March 2023 36	Accrington Stanley	1–3	Portsmouth	Accrington
19:45 GMT	Jensen (red card) 10'; Rodgers (yellow card) 49'; Fernandes (yellow card) 62'; Leigh (yellow card) 73'; Adedoyin 88'	Report	Pigott 13', (red card) 66'; Morrell (yellow card) 46'; Hackett-Fairchild 57'; Bishop 81'; Scarlett (yellow card) 90+5'	Stadium: Wham Stadium; Attendance: 2,473; Referee: David Rock

18 March 2023 37	Bristol Rovers	0–2	Portsmouth	Bristol
15:00 GMT	Whelan (yellow card) 20'; Ward (yellow card) 36'; MacDonald (yellow card) 58'; Quansah (red card) 89'	Report	Bishop 18', 69'; Tunnicliffe (yellow card) 77'; Morrell (yellow card) 89'	Stadium: Memorial Stadium; Attendance: 9,448; Referee: James Bell

25 March 2023 38	Portsmouth	2–2	Port Vale	Portsmouth
15:00 GMT	Bishop (penalty missed) 44', 67' (pen.); Jacobs 70'	Report	Taylor 8'; Donnelly (yellow card) 39'; Ojo 39'; Robinson (yellow card) 41'; Smith (yellow card) 43'; Benning (yellow card) 65'; Proctor (yellow card) 90+2'	Stadium: Fratton Park; Attendance: 18,046 (795 away fans); Referee: Neil Hair

1 April 2023 39	Portsmouth	1–0	Forest Green Rovers	Portsmouth
15:00 BST	Lowery (yellow card) 38'; Dale (yellow card) 44', (goal) 51'; Towler (yellow card) 85'	Report	Garrick (yellow card) 44'; Godwin-Malife (yellow card) 75'	Stadium: Fratton Park; Attendance: 17,968; Referee: Paul Howard

7 April 2023 40	Milton Keynes Dons	1–1	Portsmouth	Denbigh
15:00 BST	Eisa 65'	Report	Ogilvie 14' (yellow card) 24'; Pack (yellow card) 26'; Morrell (red card) 39'; Raggett (yellow card) 53'; Bishop (yellow card) 73'	Stadium: Stadium MK; Attendance: 11,395; Referee: Carl Brook

10 April 2023 41	Portsmouth	0–0	Morecambe	Portsmouth
15:00 BST	Dale (yellow card) 90'; Bishop (yellow card) 90+3'	Report	Austerfield (yellow card) 42'; Rawson (yellow card) 59'	Stadium: Fratton Park; Attendance: 17,739; Referee: Ollie Yates

15 April 2023 42	Shrewsbury Town	1–1	Portsmouth	Shrewsbury
15:00 BST	Street 52', (yellow card) 56'; Bennett (yellow card) 61'; Maroši (yellow card) 72'; Flanagan (yellow card) 83' (yellow-red card) 86'	Report	Pack (yellow card) 12', (goal) 82'; Robertson (yellow card) 56'; Raggett (yellow card) 90+5'	Stadium: New Meadow; Attendance: 7,020; Referee: Tom Nield

18 April 2023 43	Oxford United	1–1	Portsmouth	Littlemore
19:45 BST	Brannagan (yellow card) 52'	Report	Lane (yellow card) 20'; Pack 26'; Bernard (yellow card) 33'; Lowery (yellow card) 43'; Raggett (yellow card) 45'; Rafferty (yellow card) 69'; Thompson (yellow card) 90+2'	Stadium: Kassam Stadium; Attendance: 8,345; Referee: Declan Bourne

22 April 2023 44	Portsmouth	1–0	Accrington Stanley	Portsmouth
15:00 BST	Pigott 75'	Report	Clark (yellow card) 19'; McConville (yellow card) 69'	Stadium: Fratton Park; Attendance: 17,594 (126 away fans); Referee: Darren Drysdale

29 April 2023 45	Derby County	1–1	Portsmouth	Derby
15:00 BST	Collins 71'	Report	Towler (yellow card) 6'; Bishop 24'; Morrell (yellow card) 55'	Stadium: Pride Park Stadium; Attendance: 31,744 (3,120 Pompey fans); Referee: Lee Swabey

7 May 2023 46	Portsmouth	2–2	Wycombe Wanderers	Portsmouth
12:00 BST	Pack 44'; Pack (yellow card) 70'; Lane 72'	Report	McCleary 31'; Wing (yellow card) 45'; Wing 54'	Stadium: Fratton Park; Attendance: 18,286 (951 away fans); Referee: Sunny Sukhvir Gill

=== FA Cup ===
Portsmouth were drawn away to Hereford in the first round, at home to Milton Keynes Dons in the second round and away to Tottenham Hotspur in the third round.

Win Draw Loss Fixtures

4 November 2022 First round	Hereford	1–3	Portsmouth	Hereford
19:55 GMT	Storey 26'; Evans (yellow card) 75'	Report	Mingi (yellow card) 17'; Koroma (yellow card) 29'; Hackett 33'; Bishop 64'; Pigott 80'	Stadium: Edgar Street; Attendance: 4,912; Referee: Sebastian Stockbridge

26 November 2022 Second round	Portsmouth	3–2	Milton Keynes Dons	Portsmouth
15:00 GMT	Hackett-Fairchild 22'; Bishop 35' (pen.), 48' (pen.)	Report	Burns 19'; McEachran (yellow card) 38'; Eisa 61'; Lawrence (yellow card) 89'	Stadium: Fratton Park; Attendance: 8,056; Referee: Sunny Gill

7 January 2023 Third round	Tottenham Hotspur	1–0	Portsmouth	Tottenham
12:30 GMT	Kane 50'; Davies (yellow card) 90'	Report	Thompson (yellow card) 77'	Stadium: Tottenham Hotspur Stadium; Attendance: 60,161; Referee: Thomas Bramall

=== EFL Cup ===
Pompey were drawn away to Cardiff City in the first round and to Newport County in the second round.

Win Draw Loss Fixtures

9 August 2022 First round	Cardiff City	0–3	Portsmouth	Leckwith
19:45 BST	Nelson (yellow card) 7'; Daley-Campbell (red card) 89'	Report	Pigott 58'; Mingi (yellow card) 58'; Curtis 68' (pen.); Bishop 72'	Stadium: Cardiff City Stadium; Attendance: 6,303; Referee: Lee Swabey

23 August 2022 Second round	Newport County	3–2	Portsmouth	Newport
19:45 BST	Evans 14', (yellow card) 86'; Wildig 50'; Waite 74'; Wilmott (yellow card) 81'; Drysdale (yellow card) 90+4'	Report	Curtis 9', 25'; Raggett (yellow card) 69'; Mingi (yellow card) 84'	Stadium: Rodney Parade; Attendance: 3,866; Referee: John Busby

=== EFL Trophy ===
On 20 June, the initial Group stage draw was made, grouping Portsmouth with AFC Wimbledon and Crawley Town. Three days later, Aston Villa U21s joined Southern Group B. Pompey were then drawn away to Ipswich Town in the second round, and at home to Stevenage in the third round and away to Bolton Wanderers in the quarter-final.

Pos	Div	Team	Pld	W	PW	PL	L	GF	GA	GD	Pts	Qualification
1	L2	AFC Wimbledon	3	2	0	1	0	6	4	+2	7	Advance to Round 2
2	L1	Portsmouth	3	1	1	1	0	8	3	+5	6	Advance to Round 2
3	L2	Crawley Town	3	1	1	0	1	9	7	+2	5	
4	ACA	Aston Villa U21	3	0	0	0	3	3	12	−9	0	

Source: EFL.com

Win Draw Loss Fixtures

30 August 2022 Group stage	Crawley Town	2–2 (6–5 p)	Portsmouth	Crawley
19:45 BST	Telford 8' (pen.); Wells (yellow card) 16'; Bremang 90+6' (pen.)	Report	Jacobs (yellow card) 57'; Robertson 74'; Scarlett 81'; Hackett-Fairchild (yellow card) 90+4'	Stadium: Broadfield Stadium; Attendance: 2,314; Referee: Sam Allison
	Penalties
	Powell (penalty scored); Bremang (penalty scored); Craig (penalty scored); Tilley (penalty missed); Nadesan (penalty scored); Ogungbo (penalty scored); Khaleel (penalty scored)		Scarlett (penalty missed); Hackett-Fairchild (penalty scored); Dale (penalty scored); Lowery (penalty scored); Pigott (penalty scored); Robertson (penalty scored); Freeman (penalty missed)

4 October 2022 Group stage	Portsmouth	5–0	Aston Villa U21	Portsmouth
19:45 BST	Curtis 2'; Jacobs 7'; Koroma 53' 63'; Hackett-Fairchild 69'	Report	O'Reilly (yellow card) 48'; Frith (yellow card) 57'; Smith (yellow card) 90+2'	Stadium: Fratton Park; Attendance: 2,805; Referee: Alan Young

1 November 2022 Group stage	Portsmouth	1–1 (3–1 p)	AFC Wimbledon	Portsmouth
19:45 BST	Curtis 15'; Hume (yellow card) 75'	Report	Biler (yellow card) 14'; Bendle (yellow card) 49'; Assal 50'	Stadium: Fratton Park; Attendance: 2,545; Referee: Craig Hicks
	Penalties
	Koroma (penalty scored); Hackett-Fairchild (penalty scored); Scarlett (penalty scored)		Hudlin (penalty scored); Frimpong (penalty missed); Senior (penalty missed); Sasu (penalty missed)

22 November 2022 Second round	Ipswich Town	0–2	Portsmouth	Ipswich
19:45 GMT	Morsy (yellow card) 45+3'	Report	Scarlett 43'; Morrison (yellow card) 60'; Dale (yellow card) 61'; Koroma (yellow card) 81'; Swanson 90+4'	Stadium: Portman Road; Attendance: 5,686; Referee: Tom Nield

13 December 2022 Third round	Portsmouth	3–0	Stevenage	Portsmouth
19:00 GMT	Dale (yellow card) 18'; Mingi 37'; Koroma 59'; Oluwayemi (yellow card) 73'; Pigott 90+4'	Report		Stadium: Fratton Park; Attendance: 2,162; Referee: Neil Hair

10 January 2023 Quarter-Final	Bolton Wanderers	1–0	Portsmouth	Bolton
19:45 GMT	Böðvarsson 17'; Johnston (yellow card) 32'	Report	Curtis (yellow card) 61'	Stadium: University of Bolton Stadium; Attendance: 4,413; Referee: Bobby Madden

== Statistics ==
=== Appearances and goals ===
As of match(es) played 7 May 2023

Players with no appearances are not included on the list
Italics indicate a loaned in player

No.	Pos	Nat	Player	Total		League One		FA Cup		EFL Cup		EFL Trophy	
No.	Pos	Nat	Player	Apps	Goals	Apps	Goals	Apps	Goals	Apps	Goals	Apps	Goals
1	GK	(England) ENG	Matt Macey	21	0	20+1	0	0+0	0	0+0	0	0+0	0
2	DF	(England) ENG	Zak Swanson	25	2	11+4	1	3+0	0	2+0	0	4+1	1
3	DF	(England) ENG	Denver Hume	20	0	4+7	0	2+1	0	0+0	0	6+0	0
4	DF	(Scotland) SCO	Clark Robertson	29	1	18+5	0	2+0	0	1+0	0	2+1	1
5	DF	(Tanzania) TAN	Haji Mnoga	3	0	0+0	0	2+0	0	0+0	0	1+0	0
6	DF	(England) ENG	Connor Ogilvie	51	5	43+0	5	2+1	0	1+0	0	3+1	0
7	MF	(England) ENG	Marlon Pack	37	5	31+1	5	1+0	0	1+1	0	1+1	0
8	MF	(England) ENG	Ryan Tunnicliffe	37	1	23+7	1	2+1	0	0+0	0	3+1	0
9	FW	(England) ENG	Colby Bishop	52	24	45+1	20	3+0	3	0+1	1	0+2	0
10	FW	(England) ENG	Joe Pigott	44	7	9+26	4	0+2	1	2+0	1	5+0	1
11	FW	(Republic of Ireland) IRL	Ronan Curtis	36	7	13+12	2	2+1	0	2+0	3	5+1	2
13	DF	(Wales) WAL	Kieron Freeman	7	0	0+1	0	0+0	0	0+1	0	3+2	0
15	FW	(England) ENG	Owen Dale	50	2	36+7	2	1+0	0	1+1	0	3+1	0
16	MF	(Wales) WAL	Joe Morrell	35	1	23+6	1	1+0	0	0+0	0	4+1	0
17	DF	(Republic of Ireland) IRL	Joe Rafferty	26	0	25+0	0	0+0	0	1+0	0	0+0	0
18	FW	(Saint Lucia) LCA	Reeco Hackett	44	6	11+22	3	3+0	2	1+1	0	4+2	1
19	FW	(England) ENG	Dane Scarlett	40	6	19+15	4	0+0	0	2+0	0	4+0	2
20	DF	(England) ENG	Sean Raggett	53	1	42+2	1	3+0	0	1+1	0	2+2	0
21	GK	(Nigeria) NGA	Josh Oluwayemi	9	0	4+0	0	0+0	0	0+0	0	5+0	0
23	MF	(Wales) WAL	Louis Thompson	19	1	9+8	1	0+1	0	0+0	0	0+1	0
24	FW	(England) ENG	Michael Jacobs	39	5	17+15	4	0+1	0	0+2	0	2+2	1
25	MF	(England) ENG	Jay Mingi	26	1	6+11	0	2+0	0	2+0	0	4+1	1
26	MF	(Wales) WAL	Tom Lowery	21	0	12+5	0	0+1	0	1+1	0	0+1	0
28	DF	(Jamaica) JAM	Di'Shon Bernard	10	0	7+3	0	0+0	0	0+0	0	0+0	0
29	FW	(Northern Ireland) NIR	Paddy Lane	15	1	10+5	1	0+0	0	0+0	0	0+0	0
34	DF	(England) ENG	Ryley Towler	20	2	18+2	2	0+0	0	0+0	0	0+0	0
35	FW	(England) ENG	Adam Payce	2	0	0+0	0	0+0	0	0+0	0	0+2	0
36	DF	(England) ENG	Josh Dockerill	1	0	0+0	0	0+0	0	0+0	0	0+1	0
37	DF	(England) ENG	Harvey Laidlaw	1	0	0+0	0	0+0	0	0+0	0	0+1	0
38	DF	(England) ENG	Brian Quarm	1	0	0+0	0	0+0	0	0+0	0	0+1	0
Player(s) who featured whilst on loan but returned to parent club during the season:
1	GK	(England) ENG	Josh Griffiths	28	0	27+0	0	0+0	0	0+0	0	1+0	0
27	FW	(Sierra Leone) SLE	Josh Koroma	24	5	9+7	2	1+2	0	0+0	0	2+3	3
Player(s) who featured but departed permanently during the season:
28	DF	(England) ENG	Michael Morrison	28	0	18+4	0	2+0	0	0+1	0	3+0	0

=== Disciplinary record ===
As of match(es) played 7 May 2023

Players with no cards are not included on the list
Italics indicate a loaned in player

No.	Pos	Nat	Player	Total		League One		FA Cup		EFL Cup		EFL Trophy	
No.	Pos	Nat	Player	Yellow card	Red card	Yellow card	Red card	Yellow card	Red card	Yellow card	Red card	Yellow card	Red card
2	DF	(England) ENG	Zak Swanson	1	0	1	0	0	0	0	0	0	0
3	DF	(England) ENG	Denver Hume	2	0	1	0	0	0	0	0	1	0
4	DF	(Scotland) SCO	Clark Robertson	5	0	5	0	0	0	0	0	0	0
6	DF	(England) ENG	Connor Ogilvie	5	0	5	0	0	0	0	0	0	0
7	MF	(England) ENG	Marlon Pack	12	2	12	2	0	0	0	0	0	0
8	MF	(England) ENG	Ryan Tunnicliffe	2	0	2	0	0	0	0	0	0	0
9	FW	(England) ENG	Colby Bishop	6	0	6	0	0	0	0	0	0	0
10	FW	(England) ENG	Joe Pigott	1	1	1	1	0	0	0	0	0	0
11	FW	(Republic of Ireland) IRL	Ronan Curtis	4	0	2	0	0	0	1	0	1	0
15	FW	(England) ENG	Owen Dale	8	0	6	0	0	0	0	0	2	0
16	MF	(Wales) WAL	Joe Morrell	11	2	11	2	0	0	0	0	0	0
17	DF	(Republic of Ireland) IRL	Joe Rafferty	4	0	4	0	0	0	0	0	0	0
18	FW	(Saint Lucia) LCA	Reeco Hackett	5	0	4	0	0	0	0	0	1	0
19	FW	(England) ENG	Dane Scarlett	4	0	4	0	0	0	0	0	0	0
20	DF	(England) ENG	Sean Raggett	8	0	7	0	0	0	1	0	0	0
21	GK	(Nigeria) NGA	Josh Oluwayemi	1	0	0	0	0	0	0	0	1	0
23	MF	(Wales) WAL	Louis Thompson	4	0	3	0	1	0	0	0	0	0
24	FW	(England) ENG	Michael Jacobs	1	0	0	0	0	0	0	0	1	0
25	MF	(England) ENG	Jay Mingi	5	0	2	0	1	0	2	0	0	0
26	MF	(Wales) WAL	Tom Lowery	3	0	3	0	0	0	0	0	0	0
28	DF	(Jamaica) JAM	Di'Shon Bernard	1	0	1	0	0	0	0	0	0	0
29	FW	(Northern Ireland) NIR	Paddy Lane	1	0	1	0	0	0	0	0	0	0
34	DF	(England) ENG	Ryley Towler	2	0	2	0	0	0	0	0	0	0
Player(s) who were carded whilst on loan but returned to parent club during the season:
27	FW	(Sierra Leone) SLE	Josh Koroma	2	0	0	0	1	0	0	0	1	0
Player(s) who were carded but departed permanently during the season:
28	DF	(England) ENG	Michael Morrison	4	0	3	0	0	0	0	0	1	0
Squad Total				102	5	86	5	3	0	4	0	9	0
