= Colby Bishop =

English footballer (born 1996)

Personal information
- Full name: Colby David Bishop
- Date of birth: 4 November 1996 (age 30)
- Place of birth: Nottingham, England
- Height: 5 ft 11 in (1.80 m)
- Position: Forward

Team information
- Current team: Portsmouth
- Number: 9

Youth career
- –2014: Notts County

Senior career*
Years	Team	Apps	(Gls)
2014–2016	Notts County	4	(0)
2016	→ Gloucester City (loan)	9	(2)
2016–2017	Worcester City	25	(8)
2017	Boston United	10	(0)
2017–2019	Leamington	49	(28)
2019–2022	Accrington Stanley	109	(32)
2022–	Portsmouth	171	(56)
- * Club domestic league appearances and goals as of 00:44, 24 September 2026 (UTC)

Colby David Bishop (born 4 November 1996) is an English professional footballer who plays as a forward for EFL Championship club Portsmouth.

== Early life ==
Bishop was born in Nottingham, Nottinghamshire.

== Career ==
=== Early career ===
Bishop signed his first professional contract with Notts County in November 2014. He made his first team debut for the "Magpies" in a 1–0 defeat to Milton Keynes Dons at Meadow Lane on 26 December, he was replaced by Elliott Whitehouse after 73 minutes. In May 2017 he was signed by National League North side Leamington.

=== Accrington Stanley ===
On 13 July 2019, Bishop joined Accrington Stanley of League One for an undisclosed fee. He made his debut for the club on the opening day of the season, playing the duration of a 2–0 defeat at Lincoln City, before he scored his first goal for the club in his second appearance, equalising from the penalty spot as Accrington were knocked out of the EFL Cup by Sunderland in an eventual 3–1 defeat.

=== Portsmouth ===
On 21 July 2022, Bishop signed for League One club Portsmouth for an undisclosed fee on a three-year contract, with an option to extend for a further year. At the end of the 2022–23 season, Bishop was named as Portsmouth's Player of the Season.

Ahead of the 2024–25 season, a routine heart scan identified a potential risk to Bishop who would undergo immediate surgery to rectify the matter.

== Career statistics ==
As of 19 September 2026

Appearances and goals by club, season and competition
Club	Season	League			FA Cup		League Cup		Other		Total	
Club	Season	Division	Apps	Goals	Apps	Goals	Apps	Goals	Apps	Goals	Apps	Goals
Notts County	2014–15	League One	3	0	0	0	0	0	0	0	3	0
Notts County	2015–16	League Two	1	0	0	0	0	0	0	0	1	0
Notts County	Total		4	0	0	0	0	0	0	0	4	0
Gloucester City (loan)	2015–16	National League North	9	2	0	0	—		0	0	9	2
Worcester City	2016–17	National League North	25	8	0	0	—		1 (Note: Appearance(s) in FA Trophy)	0	26	8
Boston United	2016–17	National League North	10	0	0	0	—		0	0	10	0
Leamington	2017–18	National League North	19	7	2	1	—		2	0	23	8
Leamington	2018–19	National League North	28	20	0	0	—		2	1	30	21
Leamington	Total		47	27	2	1	—		4	1	53	29
Accrington Stanley	2019–20	League One	27	10	1	0	1	1	2 (Note: Appearance(s) in EFL Trophy)	1	31	12
Accrington Stanley	2020–21	League One	41	10	1	1	0	0	3	1	45	12
Accrington Stanley	2021–22	League One	41	12	1	0	2	1	3	2	47	15
Accrington Stanley	Total		109	32	3	1	3	2	8	4	123	39
Portsmouth	2022–23	League One	46	20	3	3	1	1	2	0	52	24
Portsmouth	2023–24	League One	44	21	1	0	2	0	1	0	48	21
Portsmouth	2024–25	Championship	32	11	0	0	0	0	—		32	11
Portsmouth	2025–26	Championship	42	3	1	1	0	0	—		43	4
Portsmouth	2026–27	Championship	7	1	0	0	1	0	—		8	1
Portsmouth	Total		171	56	5	4	4	1	3	0	183	61
Career total			375	125	10	6	7	3	16	5	408	139

== Honours ==
Portsmouth

- EFL League One: 2023–24

Individual

- Portsmouth Player of the Season: 2022–23
- PFA Team of the Year: 2023–24 League One
