= Jay Mingi =

English footballer

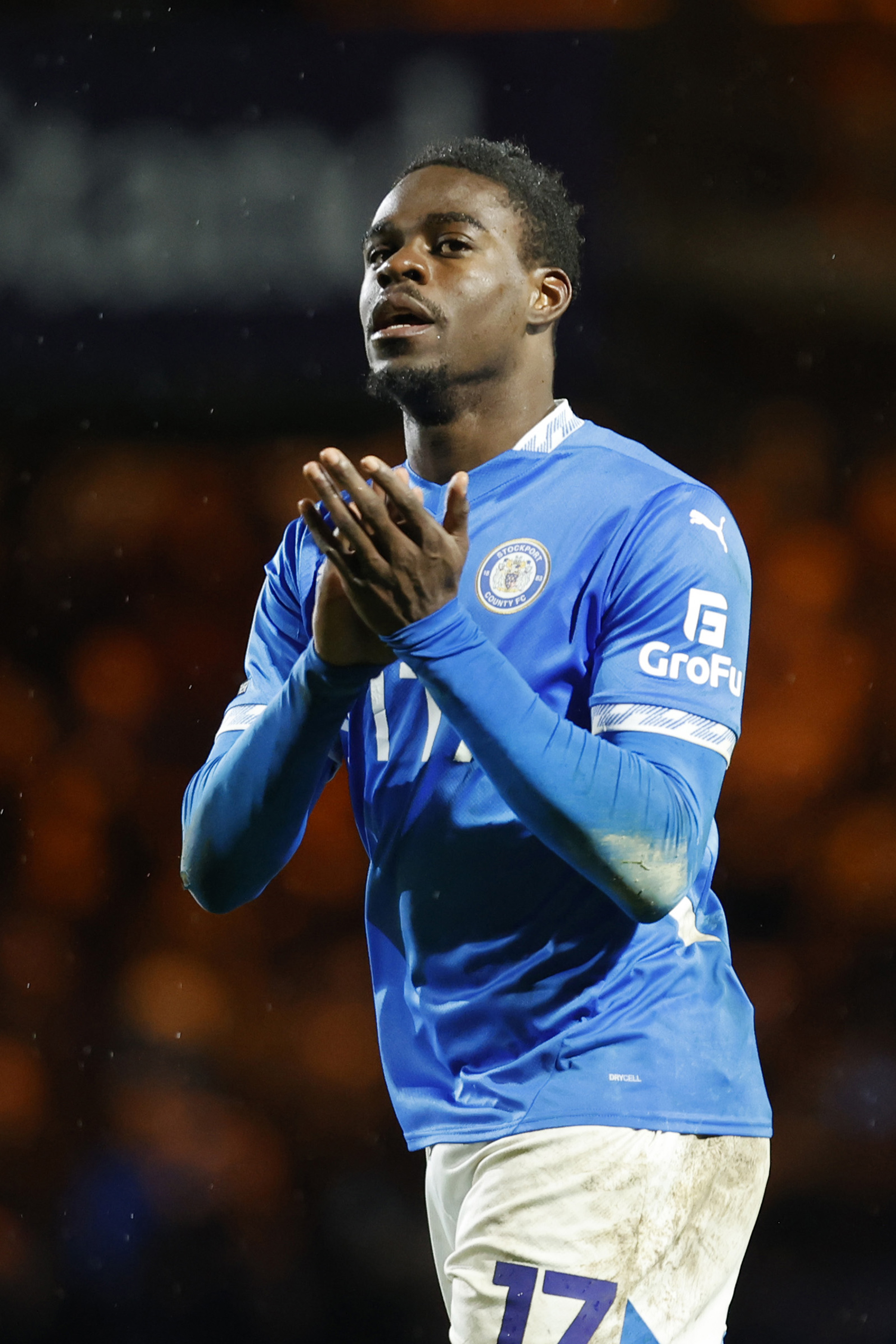
- Jay Mingi in action for Stockport County

Personal information
- Full name: Jade Jay Mingi
- Date of birth: 22 October 2000 (age 26)
- Place of birth: Hackney, England
- Height: 1.85 m (6 ft 1 in)
- Positions: Right-back; centre-back

Team information
- Current team: Stockport County
- Number: 17

Youth career
- –2019: West Ham United
- 2019–2020: Charlton Athletic

Senior career*
Years	Team	Apps	(Gls)
2020–2021	Charlton Athletic	0	(0)
2021–2023	Portsmouth	20	(0)
2021–2022	→ Maidenhead United (loan)	8	(1)
2023–2024	Colchester United	25	(1)
2024–	Stockport County	11	(0)
2025–2026	→ Crewe Alexandra (loan)	6	(0)
2026	→ Forest Green Rovers (loan)	9	(1)
- * Club domestic league appearances and goals as of 17:10, 26 May 2026 (UTC)

Jade Jay Mingi (born 22 October 2000) is an English footballer who plays as a right-back or centre-back for EFL League One club Stockport County.

== Career ==
Mingi came through West Ham United's academy before joining Charlton Athletic on a professional contract in 2019 after being released by West Ham.

=== Charlton Athletic ===
He made his debut for Charlton Athletic on 30 September 2020 in a 1–1 EFL Trophy draw with Brighton U21, before scoring his first goal the following match as Charlton defeated Leyton Orient 3–1, again in the EFL Trophy.

=== Portsmouth ===
On 24 September 2021, Mingi joined Portsmouth having been released by Charlton Athletic. Mingi joined Maidenhead United on a one-month loan on 5 October 2021.

Mingi made his first league start for Portsmouth in a 1–0 victory over Forest Green Rovers in October 2022. Mingi scored his first goal for Portsmouth, with the opening goal of a 3–0 EFL Trophy victory over Stevenage on 13 December. Having suffered an injury in January 2023, Mingi returned to fitness in March 2023 but failed to make a further league appearance for the club, having made 17 league appearances that season prior to his injury. Having been linked in the media with a transfer to a number of EFL Championship clubs, including West Bromwich Albion, Huddersfield Town and Birmingham City, Mingi left Portsmouth upon the end of his contract at the end of the season, despite having been offered a new three-year deal.

=== Colchester United ===
On 1 September 2023, Mingi joined EFL League Two club Colchester United on a two-year contract, with Portsmouth reportedly receiving a five-figure compensation package.

=== Stockport County ===
On 14 June 2024, Mingi joined EFL League One club Stockport County on a three-year contract,

On 1 September 2025, Mingi joined League Two club Crewe Alexandra on a season-long loan deal, making his club debut the following day in Crewe's 7–1 defeat of Chesterfield in an EFL Trophy group stage game. He returned to his parent club on 23 January, allowing him to join National League side Forest Green Rovers on loan for the remainder of the season.

== Style of play ==
Mingi plays as a midfielder. He has been noted for his ball-carrying ability.

== Career statistics ==
As of match played on 29 April 2026

Appearances and goals by club, season and competition
Club	Season	League			National cup		League cup		Other		Total	
Club	Season	Division	Apps	Goals	Apps	Goals	Apps	Goals	Apps	Goals	Apps	Goals
Charlton Athletic	2020–21	League One	0	0	0	0	0	0	2 (Note: Appearance(s) in EFL Trophy)	1	2	1
Portsmouth	2021–22	League One	3	0	0	0	0	0	0	0	3	0
Portsmouth	2022–23	League One	17	0	2	0	2	0	5	1	26	1
Portsmouth	Total		20	0	2	0	2	0	5	1	29	1
Maidenhead United (loan)	2021–22	National League	8	1	2	0	0	0	0	0	10	1
Colchester United	2023–24	League Two	25	1	0	0	0	0	3	0	28	1
Stockport County	2024–25	League One	11	0	1	0	0	0	2	0	14	0
Stockport County	2025–26	League One	0	0	0	0	1	0	0	0	1	0
Stockport County	2026–27	League One	0	0	0	0	0	0	0	0	0	0
Stockport County	Total		11	0	1	0	1	0	2	0	15	0
Crewe Alexandra (loan)	2025–26	League Two	6	0	1	0	0	0	2	0	9	0
Forest Green Rovers (loan)	2025–26	National League	9	1	0	0	0	0	2 (Note: One appearance in FA Trophy, one appearance in National League play-offs)	0	11	1
Career total			79	3	6	0	3	0	16	2	104	5
