= Joe Morrell =

Wales international footballer (born 1997)

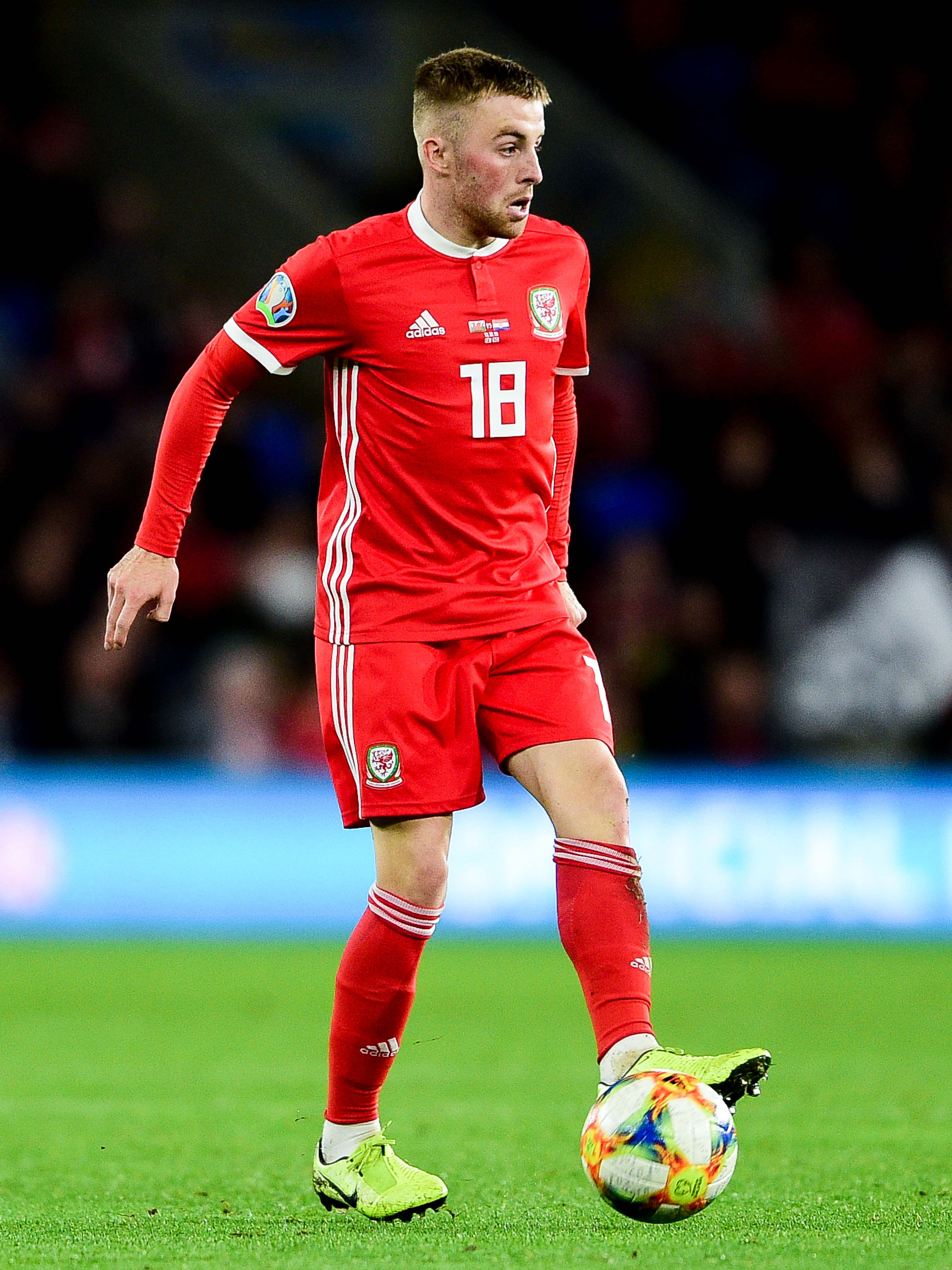
- Morrell with Wales in 2019

Personal information
- Full name: Joseff John Morrell
- Date of birth: 3 January 1997 (age 29)
- Place of birth: Ipswich, England
- Height: 5 ft 6 in (1.68 m)
- Position: Central midfielder

Youth career
- –2013: Bristol City

Senior career*
Years	Team	Apps	(Gls)
2013–2020	Bristol City	1	(0)
2016	→ Sutton United (loan)	3	(0)
2017	→ Margate (loan)	2	(0)
2017–2018	→ Cheltenham Town (loan)	38	(3)
2019–2020	→ Lincoln City (loan)	29	(0)
2020–2021	Luton Town	10	(0)
2021–2024	Portsmouth	92	(1)
Total		175	(4)

International career
2013–2014	Wales U17	6	(1)
2014–2015	Wales U19	10	(0)
2017–2018	Wales U21	8	(3)
2019–2023	Wales	37	(0)
- * Club domestic league appearances and goals

Joseff John Morrell (born 3 January 1997) is a former professional footballer who played as a central midfielder. He represented the Wales national team at international level.

== Club career ==
Morrell began his career with Bristol City whilst attending The Castle School in Thornbury, and signed a professional contract with the club in December 2012 after turning down an offer from Liverpool. He made his debut on 8 October 2013 in a 2–1 Football League Trophy defeat against Wycombe Wanderers.

In August 2016 it was announced that Morrell would join National League club Sutton United, initially on a one-month loan. He made his first appearance for the U's as a substitute coming on at 61' in a 3–1 victory over Lincoln City at Sincil Bank on 13 August 2016, Sutton's first win in English football's fifth tier in 16 years. One reporter described Morrell as having "had a great competitive debut overall". He made two further substitute appearances in home victories against Torquay United and Macclesfield Town before returning to his parent club in early September 2016.

On 24 February 2017, Morrell joined Margate on loan for a month. He made his debut as a 58th minute substitute during a 2–0 home loss to Whitehawk.

On 30 August 2017, Morrell signed for Cheltenham Town on loan until January 2018. His first goal for the club came in a 3–0 win against Mansfield Town and scored three times in total for the club.

On 27 June 2019, Morrell signed for Lincoln City on a season-long loan until May 2020. He scored his first goal in a dominant 5–1 win against Bolton Wanderers on 14 January 2020, however it was later given as an own-goal for Josh Emmanuel.

In November 2019 he signed a new contract with Bristol City.

On 7 March 2020, Morrell played his final game for the Imps against Burton Albion, due to the season being cancelled early because of COVID-19.

In June 2020, Morrell was named Lincoln City's Player of the Season.

=== Luton Town ===
On 15 October 2020 Morrell joined Luton Town for an undisclosed fee.

=== Portsmouth ===
On 9 August 2021, Morrell joined EFL League One Portsmouth for an undisclosed fee on a 3-year contract with a 12-month extension clause. On 21 January 2023, Morrell scored his first goal for Portsmouth against Exeter City after 49 games and 13 league appearances in the 2022–23 season Morrell suffered a knee injury in January 2024 and he was released by Portsmouth at the end of the 2023-24 season.

== International career ==
Morrell qualifies to play for Wales through his Welsh mother Sian.

In October 2017, Morrell made his Wales U21 debut in a 3–1 victory against Liechtenstein.

In August 2019, Morrell was named in the Wales squad ahead of their Euro 2020 qualifier against Azerbaijan. He made his senior international debut for Wales against Belarus on 9 September 2019.

In May 2021 he was selected for the Wales squad for the delayed UEFA Euro 2020 tournament. In November 2022 he was named in the Wales squad for the 2022 FIFA World Cup in Qatar. Morrell made his World cup debut coming on as a late substitute against the United States in Wales' opening 2022 FIFA World Cup Group B game, Morrell also came on as a substitute in the group stage game against England.

== Career statistics ==
=== Club ===
As of match played 30 January 2024

Appearances and goals by club, season and competition
Club	Season	League			FA Cup		League Cup		Other		Total	
Club	Season	Division	Apps	Goals	Apps	Goals	Apps	Goals	Apps	Goals	Apps	Goals
Bristol City	2013–14	League One	0	0	0	0	0	0	1 (Note: Appearance in Football League Trophy)	0	1	0
Bristol City	2014–15	League One	0	0	0	0	0	0	0	0	0	0
Bristol City	2015–16	Championship	0	0	0	0	0	0	—		0	0
Bristol City	2016–17	Championship	0	0	0	0	0	0	—		0	0
Bristol City	2017–18	Championship	0	0	0	0	1	0	—		1	0
Bristol City	2018–19	Championship	1	0	3	0	0	0	—		4	0
Bristol City	2019–20	Championship	0	0	0	0	0	0	—		0	0
Bristol City	Total		1	0	3	0	1	0	1	0	6	0
Sutton United (loan)	2016–17	National League	3	0	0	0	—		0	0	3	0
Margate (loan)	2016–17	National League South	2	0	0	0	—		0	0	2	0
Cheltenham Town (loan)	2017–18	League Two	38	3	1	0	0	0	0	0	39	3
Lincoln City (loan)	2019–20	League One	29	0	1	0	2	0	0	0	32	0
Luton Town	2020–21	Championship	10	0	1	0	0	0	—		11	0
Portsmouth	2021–22	League One	36	0	1	0	0	0	2 (Note: Appearance(s) in EFL Trophy)	0	39	0
Portsmouth	2022–23	League One	29	1	1	0	0	0	5	0	35	1
Portsmouth	2023–24	League One	27	0	1	0	2	0	1	0	31	0
Portsmouth	Total		92	1	3	0	2	0	8	0	105	1
Career total			171	4	8	0	4	0	9	0	199	4

=== International ===
As of match played on 7 September 2023.

Appearances and goals by national team and year
National team	Year	Apps	Goals
Wales	2019	5	0
Wales	2020	7	0
Wales	2021	13	0
Wales	2022	7	0
Wales	2023	5	0
Total		37	0

== Honours ==
Portsmouth

- EFL League One: 2023–24

Individual

- Lincoln City Player of the Year: 2019–20
